= Ramallah =

City in the West Bank, Palestine

Ramallah رام الله
- Municipality type A (City)

Arabic transcription(s)
  - Arabic: رام الله
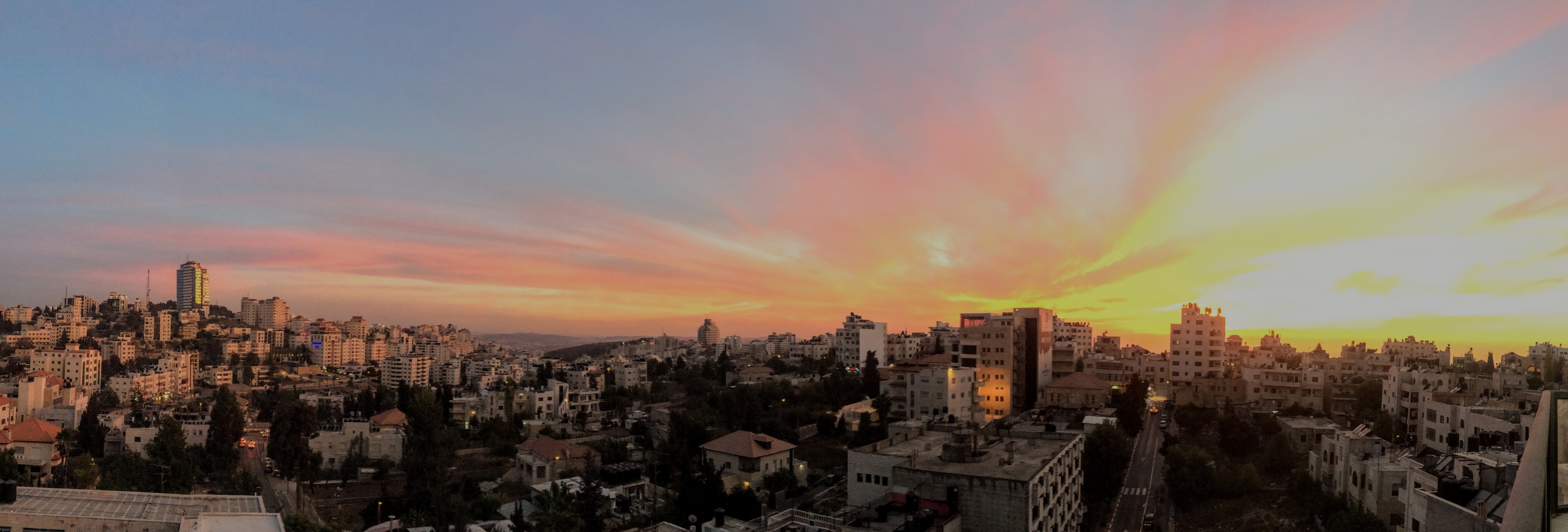
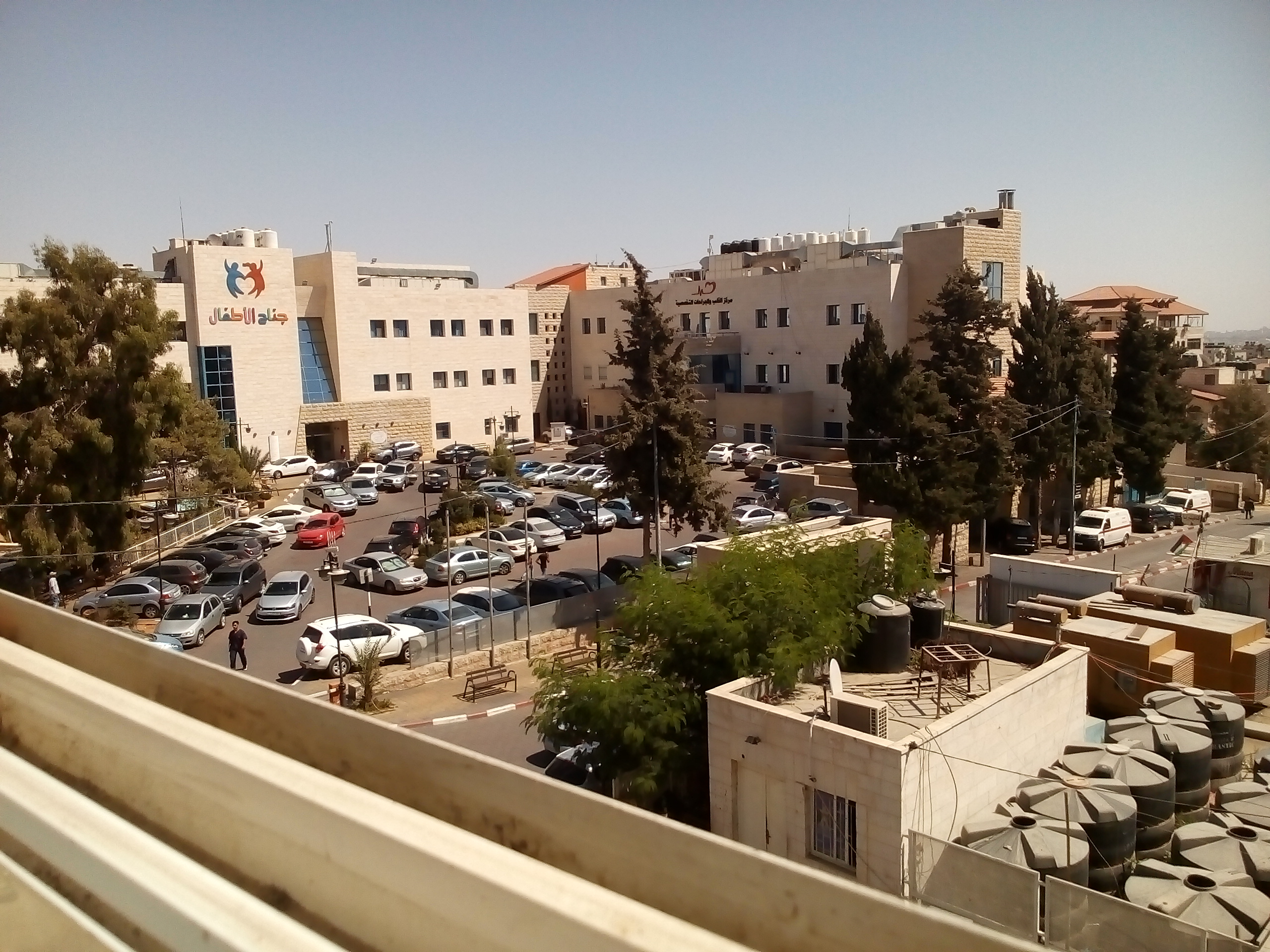
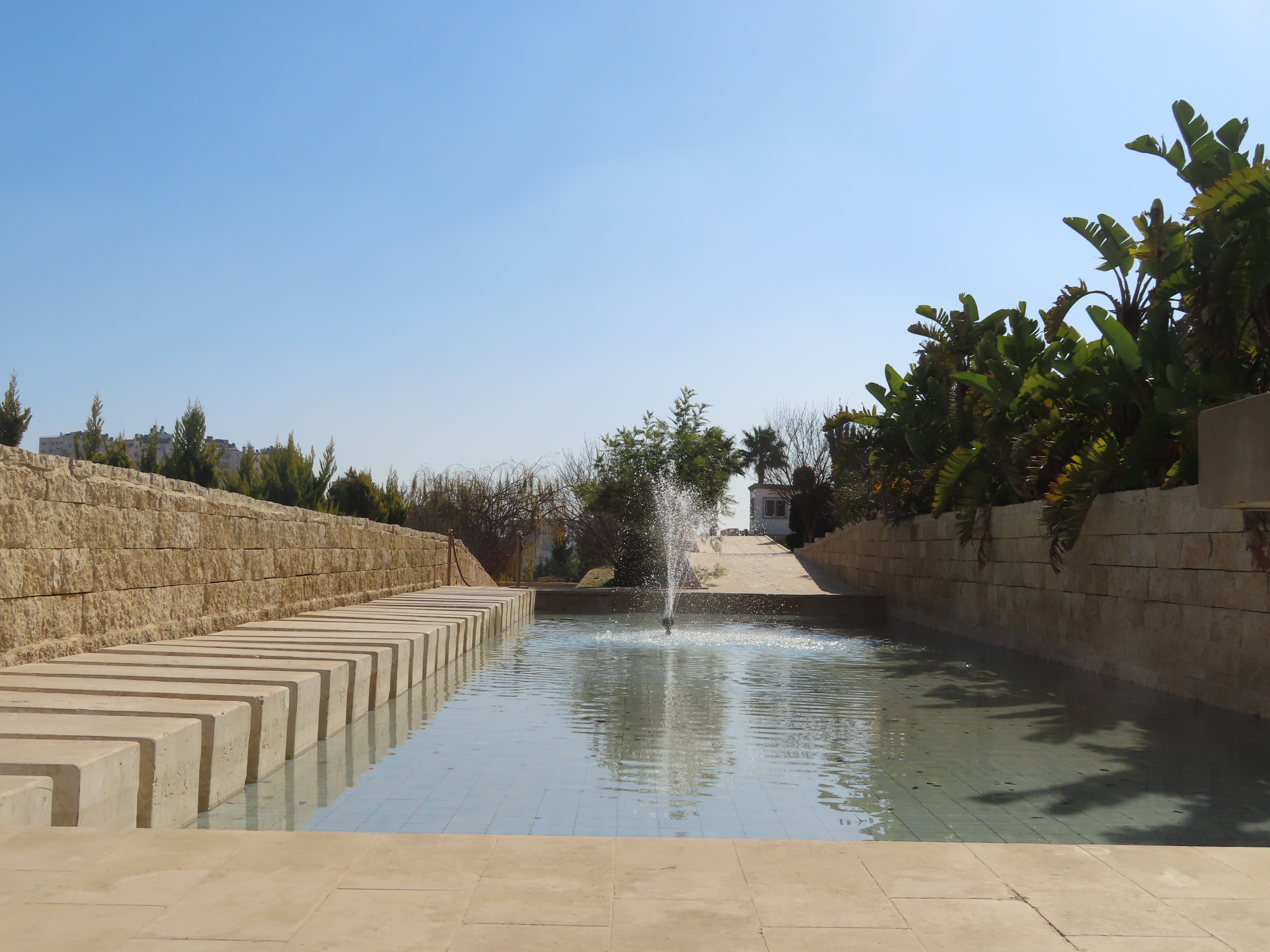
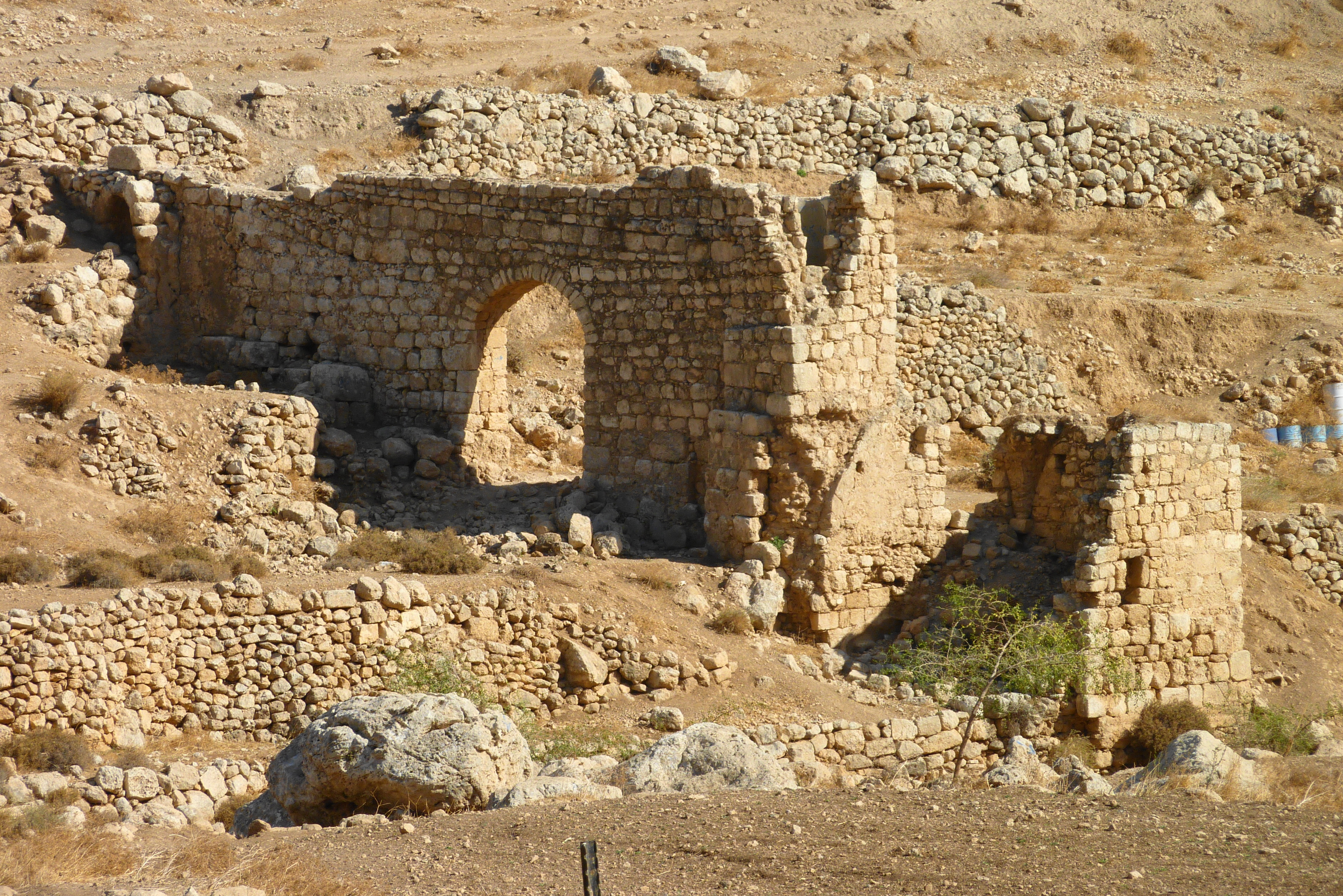
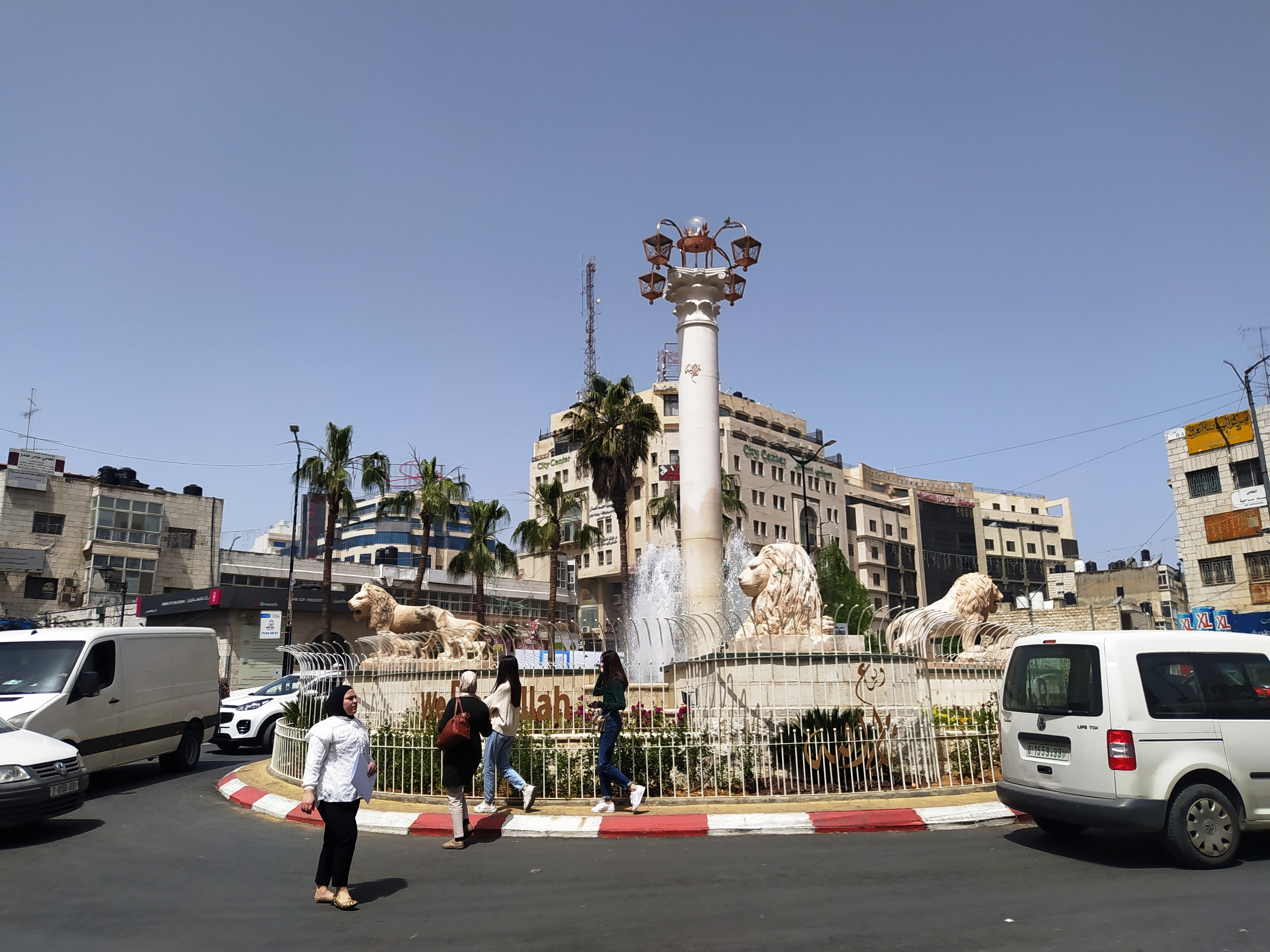
- Ramallah skyline Palestine Medical Complex Darwish Museum Roman ruins Al-Manara Square

- Municipal seal of Ramallah
- Interactive map of Ramallah
- Location of Ramallah within Palestine
- Palestine grid: 168/145
- State: Palestine
- Governorate: Ramallah and al-Bireh

Government
  - Type: City (from 1995)
  - Mayor: Issa Kassis

Area
  - Municipality type A (City): 16.3 km^{2} (6.3 sq mi)

Population (2024)
  - Municipality type A (City): 43,880
  - Density: 2,690/km^{2} (6,970/sq mi)
  - Metro: 153,237 (2002); 362,445 (2016)
- Website: www.ramallah.ps

Ramallah (UK: /rəˈmælə/ rə-MAL-ə, US: /rəˈmɑːlə/ rə-MAH-lə; Arabic: رام الله, romanized: Rām Allāh, IPA: [raːm alˤˈlˤaːh], locally [rɑːm ˈɑlˤlˤɑh]; lit. 'God's Height') is a city in the central West Bank, Palestine. It serves as the administrative capital of Palestine, as well as capital of the Ramallah and al-Bireh Governorate. The city is situated on the Judaean Mountains, 10 km (6 miles) north of Jerusalem, at an average elevation of 872 meters (2,861 ft) above sea level, adjacent to al-Bireh.

Ramallah has buildings containing masonry from the period of Herod the Great, but no complete building predates the Crusades of the 11th century. In the 14th century, during Mamluk rule (1260–1516), Ramallah was a mixed Christian and Muslim village whose residents engaged in orchard farming and whose revenues belonged to an endowment for the Cave of the Patriarchs in Hebron. It declined toward the end of Mamluk rule, but was resettled in the early 16th century, at first by small numbers of local Muslims then in significant numbers by Christians from Palestine and Transjordan. The local tradition ascribes modern Ramallah's founding at this time by the Hadaddin, Arab Christians who claimed descent from the Ghassanids, which partially correlates with official Ottoman records. Its lands remained endowed through the late 19th century, though by then for the Dome of the Rock.

Palestine came under British rule in 1920 and Ramallah's economy and status improved during this period. The 1948 Arab–Israeli War saw the entire West Bank, including Ramallah, occupied and annexed by Transjordan. Ramallah was later captured by Israel in the 1967 Six-Day War. Since the 1995 Oslo Accords, Ramallah has been governed by the Palestinian Authority, as part of Area A in the West Bank. Ramallah has emerged as a key political, cultural, and economic center since then. It houses various Palestinian governmental bodies, including the Mukataa, the official residence of the president of the Palestinian National Authority, the Palestinian Legislative Council, and the headquarters of the Palestinian Security Services. It is also home to several museums and cultural centers, and has a notable nightlife scene. Historically, the city was a predominantly Christian town; however, the population of Muslims has increased to constitute a majority of Ramallah's 38,998 residents by 2017, while Christians make up a significant minority.

== History ==
=== Early history ===
Ancient rock-cut tombs have been found near Ramallah. Located just south of the built-up area is Tell en-Nasbeh, an archeological site where biblical Mizpah in Benjamin is likely to have been located.

Several Ramallah buildings incorporate masonry dating back to the reign of Herod the Great (37–4 BCE). Potsherds from the Crusader/Ayyubid and early Ottoman period have also been found there. Ramallah was mentioned as collateral of an 1186 agreement between Guy of Lusignan and the hospital in Jerusalem. In a Crusader-period manuscript from 1198, Ramallah was identified as Ramalie, a farming settlement in the environs of Jerusalem. Remains of a building with an arched doorway from the Crusader era, called al-Burj, have been identified, but the original use of the building is undetermined.

=== Mamluk period ===
Ramallah, along with many other villages in its vicinity, is mentioned in a corpus of waqf (endowment) documents stored in Jerusalem dating to the first decade of the 14th century, during Mamluk rule in Palestine (1260–1516). The waqf was most likely established by Sultan Qalawun in c. 1280. While some of the villages' agricultural output was earmarked for the Haram al-Sharif (Temple Mount) of Jerusalem, Ramallah's revenues were for the benefit of the Ibrahimi Mosque (Cave of the Patriarchs) of Hebron. The document concerning Ramallah was an acknowledgement by twelve of the village's fellahin (peasants) of their mutually guaranteed and equally shared obligation to pay 950 dirhams for the Hebron waqf from the sale revenues of their apples, olives and cotton; the villagers also cultivated grain and vetch. Ramallah's reliance on orchard farming distinguished it from many of the other villages named in the waqf corpus (all located in its environs or in the Hebron area) and implies there was a greater degree of investment and private ownership by Ramallah's residents. The names of the villagers shows a mixed population of Muslims and Christians, with historian Yossef Rapoport speculating Ramallah had a Christian-majority population at the time. (Note: The named villagers were Abdallah ibn Harun, Ibrahim ibn Khalil ibn Salah and his brother Salah, Sayf ibn Qina ibn Fadl, Da'ud ibn Amr ibn Rizq, Muhammad ibn Abdallah ibn Khalifa, Sa'id ibn Hassan, Salam ibn Abd al-Wahid, Rizqallah ibn Ruzayq, Ibn Muhiyy, and Salih ibn Faris.) Ramallah was referenced as the eastern boundary of Ein Qiniya in a 1330 waqf designated by the Mamluk viceroy of Syria, Tankiz, for the Tankiziyya Madrasa of Jerusalem. The waning years of Mamluk rule were characterized economic and political upheaval and Ramallah may have been deserted during this period.

=== Ottoman period ===
The area of Ramallah was incorporated into the Ottoman Empire in 1516 with all of Palestine. A 1525 Ottoman tax register confirms Ramallah's revenues as earmarked for the Ibrahimi Mosque waqf but lists it as an uninhabited farm. Ottoman tax registers from 1531 to 1532 and 1538 and Jerusalem court records from 1541 and 1548 all indicate Ramallah was resettled by this period, its revenues divided between waqfs for the Dome of the Rock, the Ibrahimi Mosque and the Tankiziyya Madrasa. Its population consisted of a few Muslim families, including the Labud from Ein Qiniya and Abu al-Thanaya. (Note: The Muslim household heads of Ramallah named in records dating to 1538–1563 were Hasan ibn Ali al-Labud and his sons Ali, Ibrahim, Khattab, Khalil and Umar and Khattab's son Hasan; Rajab ibn Ya'qub; Hammad ibn Rashid; Muhammad ibn Abi al-Thana and his son Ahmad and Hammad ibn Ahmad.)

Christian families began settling Ramallah in significant numbers by the mid-16th century, as evidenced by Ottoman tax registers and oral traditions among Ramallah's Christians. The tax register of 1553–1554 showed the Christian village of Beit Jala swelled with new residents referred to as the 'Christian Kasabra group', while the 1562 register shows that many from the Kasabra and 27 other households and eight Christian bachelors relocated from Beit Jala to Ramallah by that time. There, they joined the ten Muslim families still living in the village, including the Labud. The 1562 record also shows an increase in tax revenue, all of which emanated from wheat and barley and one quarter of which was designated for the waqf. The 'Kasabra group' referred to Christians from the region of Karak in modern southern Jordan who migrated to the area of al-Kusbar in the Hebron hill country near the village of Nuba sometime after 1539 before moving to localities across Palestine. (Note: Kasabra Christians moved to Beit Jala, Khirbet Deir al-Asal and later nearby Dayr Aban, Mujeidil in the Galilee, and Zababdeh near Jenin, according to mid to late 16th-century Ottoman tax registers. The Kasabra of Beit Jala moved to Ramallah and some of those in Ramallah later moved to Mujeidil and after its depopulation in the 1948 war to nearby Yafa al-Naseriye. Some of the Kasabra of Dayr Aban moved to the Hauran, settling in the village of al-Hirak.) A 1561 Jerusalem court document shows responsibility for cultivating Ramallah's waqf lands was split into three tracts, one to the Labud and Abu al-Thanaya families, one to the Kasabra Christians led by Ghunaym ibn Salim and one to other Christians, presumably not belonging to the Kasabra.

The Christian migration from Karak to Ramallah, as traced in the 16th-century tax records, largely correlate with the local traditions of Ramallah's history. (Note: The oral traditions of Ramallah were first published in Yusuf Jiryis Qaddura's 1954 Tarikh madinat Ramallah [History of the City of Ramallah], Khalil Abu Rayya's 1980 Ramallah qadiman wa hadithan [Ramallah Past and Present], and Aziz Shahin's 1982 Kashf al-Niqab 'an al-judud wa-l-ansab fi madinat Ramallah [Lifting the Veil on the Ancestors and Genealogy in the City of Ramallah].) This tradition attributes Ramallah's founding by five sons of Rashid ibn Saqr al-Haddadin. (Note: In the oral narrative, Haddadin was attracted to the mountainous site of Ramallah because it was similar to the mountainous areas he came from. In addition, the heavily forested area could supply him with plenty of fuel for his forges.) According to local historian Khalil Abu Rayya, the Haddadin (Arabic for 'blacksmiths') originated in the village of Ma'in near Madaba in the general vicinity of Karak, and the British orientalist Frederick Peake noted the Haddadin were one of the oldest Christian clans of Karak, claiming descent from the Ghassanids, an ancient/medieval Arab Christian tribal confederation. The local tradition of Ramallah holds the Haddadin first migrated to Halhul for several months then to Beit Jala and ultimately to Ramallah, with Halhul likely corresponding to al-Kusbar (which was located in Halhul's environs). Likewise, names of the Kasabra Christians recorded in the tax registers correspond to the local tradition. (Note: Among the names recorded were Jarir ibn Hadid, a grandson of Rashid al-Hadaddin and ancestor of the Awad family of Ramallah; Umran, Mifrih, Umayra and Ibrahim, sons of Hassan, who was another son of Rashid; Khalil, Sa'id and Salama, sons of Ibrahim, a third son of Rashid and ancestor of the Ibrahim family of Ramallah; and Dib the son of Jiryis, a fourth son of Rashid.) In 1596, the last known Ottoman tax register of Palestinian villages until the 19th century, Ramallah was listed as a village in the nahiya of Quds (Jerusalem), part of the Liwa of Quds with a population of 71 Christian households and 9 Muslim households. It paid a fixed tax rate of 25% on wheat, barley, olives, vines or fruit trees, and goats or beehives; a total of 9,400 akçe. All of the revenue went to the waqf.

In 1838, American biblical scholar Edward Robinson visited the area, noting that the inhabitants were Christian "of the Greek rite". There were 200 taxable men, which gives an estimated total population of 800–900 people. The village "belonged" to the Haram al-Sharif, Jerusalem, to which it paid an annual tax of 350 Mids of grain. In 1883, the PEF's Survey of Western Palestine described Ramallah as

A large Christian village, of well-built stone houses, standing on a high ridge, with a view on the west extending to the sea. It stands amongst gardens and olive-yards, and has three springs to the south and one on the west; on the north there are three more, within a mile from the village. On the east there is a well. There are rock-cut tombs to the north-east with well-cut entrances, but completely blocked with rubbish. In the village is a Greek church, and on the east a Latin convent and a Protestant schoolhouse, all modern buildings. The village lands are Wakuf, or ecclesiastical property, belonging to the Haram of Jerusalem. About a quarter of the inhabitants are Roman Catholics, the rest Orthodox Greeks.

=== British Mandate ===
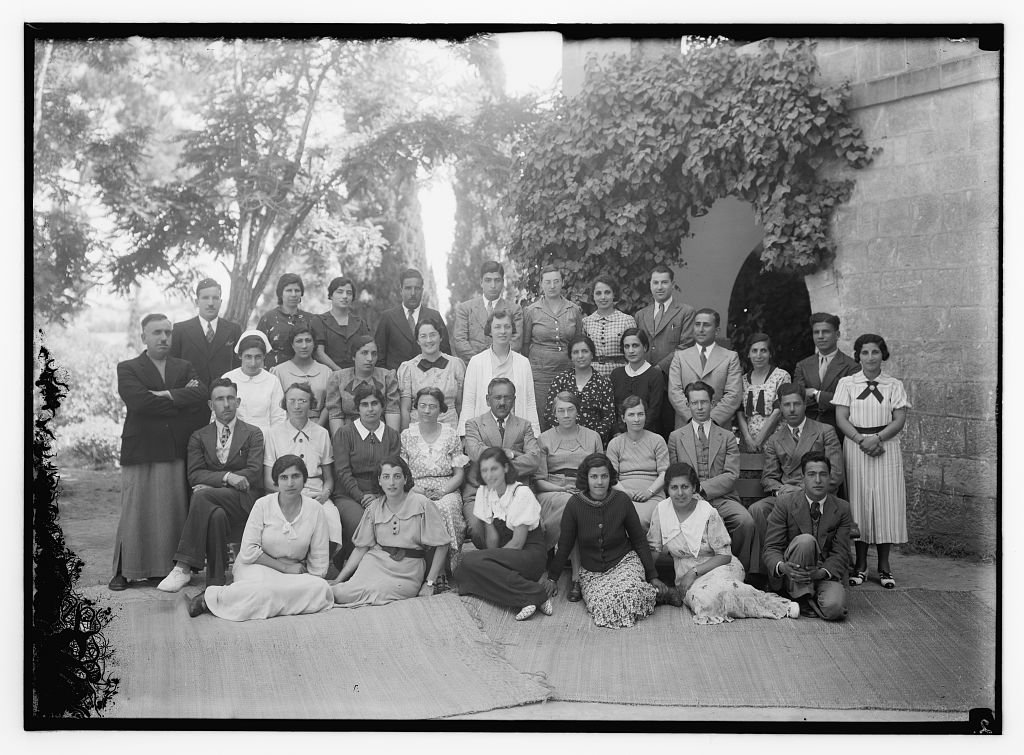
Ramallah Friends Schools, 1937

During World War I, the British Army captured and occupied Ramallah in December 1917. The city remained occupied until the designation of the Palestine Mandate in 1920, resulting in Ramallah falling under British Mandatory control until 1948. In the 1920s, the economy of Ramallah started to improve, resulting in the local Arab upper class (consisting primarily of landowners and merchants) ordering the construction of several multi-storied villas, many of which still stand today. In 1939, the Jerusalem Electric Company introduced electricity to Ramallah, and a majority of the city's homes became wired shortly thereafter. On the same year, the British Mandatory authorities inaugurated the state-owned Palestine Broadcasting Service in Ramallah, with BBC members training local radio staff to deliver daily broadcasts in Arabic, Hebrew, and English. The station was later renamed Jerusalem Calling.

The city became a center of insurgent activity when the 1936–39 Arab revolt in Palestine broke out. The rebels subsequently established a court near Ramallah, in order to provide legal alternatives to the courts of the British Mandate. One British schoolteacher noted that the Ramallah court judge began to produce "news sheets on typewriters and duplicators, aimed at publicizing the alternative rebel regime."

=== Jordanian and Israeli occupation ===
Following the creation of the State of Israel and the ensuing conflict, Jordan seized part of the territory, which they named the West Bank, which included Ramallah. Jordan annexed the West Bank, applying its national law to the conquered territory. The West Bank was relatively peaceful during the years of Jordanian occupation between 1948 and 1967, with its residents enjoying freedom of movement between the West Bank, Jordan, Lebanon, and Syria. However, many Palestinians were arrested and jailed for being members of "illegal political parties", which included the Palestine Communist Party, and other socialist and pro-independence groups. The city's population had doubled by 1953, but the economy and infrastructure could not accommodate the influx of poor villagers. Natives of Ramallah began to emigrate, primarily to the United States. About one fourth of Ramallah's 6,000 natives had left by 1956, with Arabs from the surrounding towns and villages (particularly Hebron) buying the homes and land the émigrés left behind.

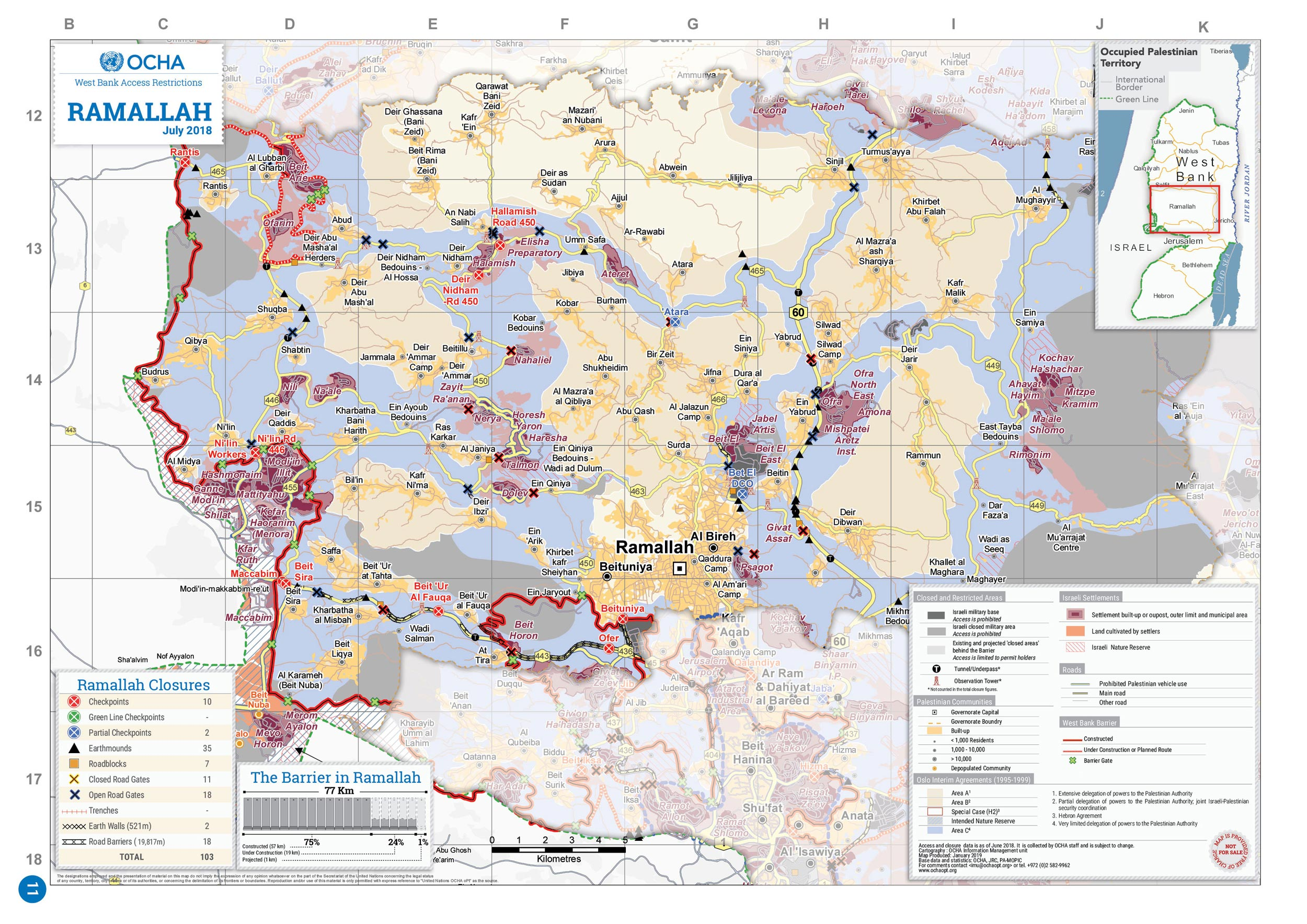
2018 United Nations map of the area, showing the Israeli occupation arrangements

During the Six-Day War in 1967, Israel captured Ramallah from Jordan, imposing a military closure and conducting a census a few weeks later. Every person registered in the census was given an Israeli identity card which allowed the bearer to continue to reside there. Those who were abroad during the census lost their residency rights. Because of Israeli control of the West Bank and Gaza Strip, for the first time in 19 years, residents of Ramallah could freely visit the Gaza Strip, as well as Israel, and engage in commerce there.

Unlike the Jordanians, Israel did not offer citizenship to the residents, who remained Jordanian citizens until 1988. Ramallah residents were issued permits to work in Israel, but did not gain the rights associated with Israeli citizenship. The city remained under Israeli military rule for more than four decades. The Israeli Civil Administration (CA), established in 1981, was in charge of civilian and day-to-day services such as issuing permission to travel, build, export or import, and host relatives from abroad. The CA reprinted Jordanian textbooks for distribution in schools but did not update them. The CA was in charge of tax collection and land expropriation, which sometimes included Israeli seizure of olive groves that Arab villagers had tended for generations.

According to the Israeli Human Rights activists, the development of Jewish settlements in the Ramallah area, such as Beit El and Psagot, prevented the expansion of the city and cut it off from the surrounding Arab villages. As resistance increased, Ramallah residents who were members of the Palestine Liberation Organization were jailed or deported to neighboring countries. The popular uprising known as the First Intifada erupted in December 1987, protesting against the continued Israeli occupation.

Ramallah residents were among the early joiners of the First Intifada. The Intifada Unified Leadership, an umbrella organization of various Palestinian factions, distributed weekly bulletins on the streets of Ramallah with a schedule of the daily protests, strikes and action against Israeli patrols in the city. At the demonstrations, tires were burned in the street, and the crowds threw stones and Molotov cocktails. The IDF responded with tear gas and rubber bullets. Schools in Ramallah were forcibly shut down, and opened gradually for a few hours a day. The Israelis conducted house arrests, imposing curfews that restricted travel and exports in what Palestinians regarded as collective punishment. In response to the closure of schools, residents organized home schooling sessions to help students make up missed material; this became one of the few symbols of civil disobedience. Following the Oslo Accords, the Israeli army abandoned the Mukataa in December 1995 and withdrew to the city outskirts. The newly-established Palestinian Authority assumed civilian and security responsibility for the city, which was designated "Area A" under the accords.

=== Palestinian Authority control ===
The years between 1993 and 2000 (known locally as the "Oslo Years") brought relative prosperity to Ramallah. Ramallah and its immediate environs were classified as Area A in the Oslo Accords, under full civil and security control of the Palestinian Authority (PA) administration in September 1995. Many expatriates returned to establish businesses there, and the atmosphere was one of optimism. In 2000, unemployment began to rise and the economy of Ramallah declined. The Israel Defense Forces remained in control of the territories and its government did not restore the freedom of movement enjoyed by Ramallah residents prior to the first Intifada. Travel to Jerusalem required special permits. The number and size of Israeli settlements around Ramallah increased dramatically. A network of bypass roads for use of Israeli citizens only was built around Ramallah, and Israel expropriated land for settlements. Many official documents previously handled by the Israeli Civil Administration were now handled by the Palestinian Authority but still required Israeli approval. A Palestinian passport issued to Ramallah residents was not valid unless the serial number was registered with the Israeli authorities, who controlled border crossings.

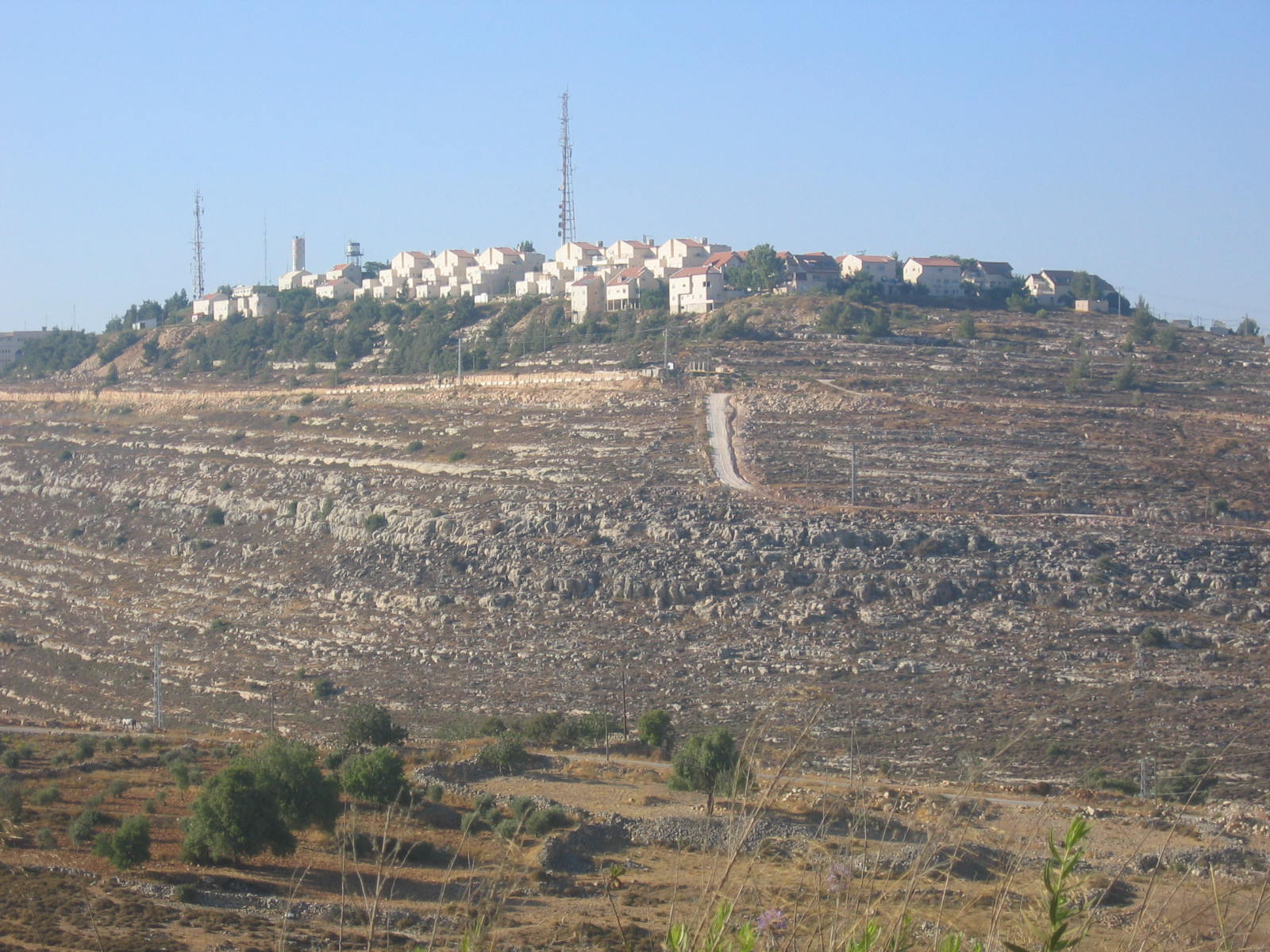
Israeli settlement of Psagot on Jabal al-Tawil (Tawil Hill), east of Ramallah and Al-Bireh (2004)

The failure of the Camp David summit in July 2000 led to the outbreak of the Second Intifada (al-Aqsa Intifada) in September 2000. Young Ramallah residents demonstrated daily against the Israeli army, with marches to the Israeli checkpoints at the outskirts of the city. Over time, the marches were replaced by sporadic use of live ammunition against Israeli soldiers; and various attacks targeting Jewish settlers, particularly on the Israeli-only bypass roads. Army checkpoints were established to restrict movement in and out of Ramallah. On October 12, 2000, two Israeli army reservists, Vadim Norzhich and Yosef Avrahami were lynched in Ramallah. They had taken a wrong turn, and were set upon by a mob, enraged in particular by the Muhammad al-Durrah incident in Gaza. A frenzied crowd killed the two IDF reservists, mutilated their bodies, and dragged them through the streets. Later that afternoon, the Israeli army carried out an air strike on Ramallah, demolishing the police station. Israel later succeeded in capturing and prosecuting some of those involved in the deaths of the reservists.

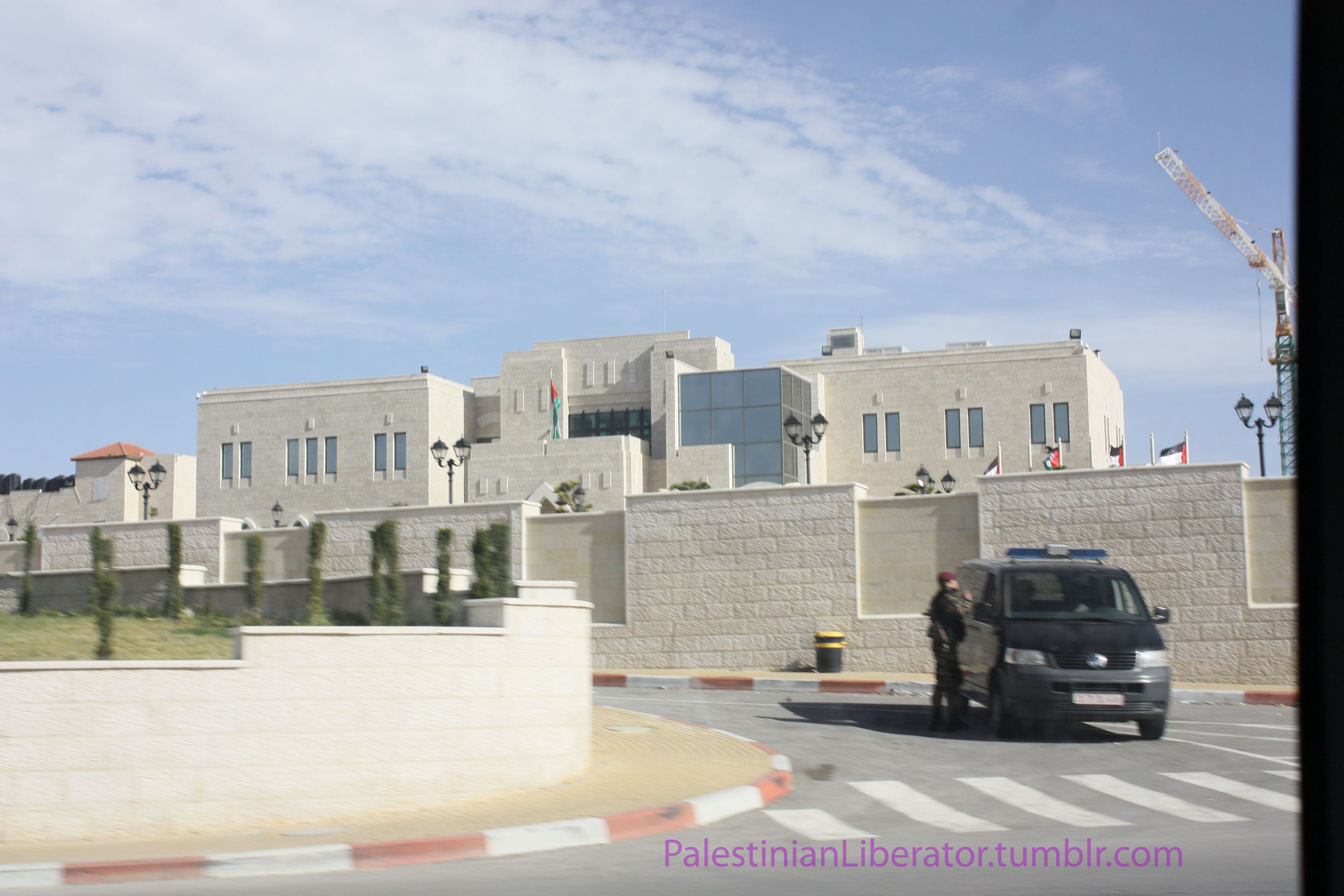
Mukataa in 2013

The IDF has occasionally operated inside Ramallah, in breach of the 1995 Oslo Accords. The first and largest incursion was the 2002 Operation Defensive Shield, with a more recent intervention coming in March 2017 while attempting to arrest a suspected terrorist. In 2002, the army imposed curfews, electricity cuts, school closures and disruptions of commercial life. Many Ramallah institutions, including government ministries, were vandalized, and equipment was destroyed or stolen. The IDF took over local Ramallah television stations, and social and economic conditions deteriorated. Many expatriates left, as did many other Palestinians who complained that the living conditions had become intolerable. Construction of the Israeli West Bank barrier has added to Ramallah's isolation. Yasser Arafat established his West Bank headquarters, the Mukataa, in Ramallah. Although considered an interim solution, Ramallah became the de facto capital of the Palestinian Authority, now officially known as the State of Palestine. It hosts almost all governmental headquarters. In December 2001, Arafat held meetings at the Mukataa, but lived with his wife and daughter in Gaza City. After suicide bombings in Haifa, Arafat was confined to the Ramallah compound. In 2002, the compound was partly demolished by the Israeli Defense Forces and Arafat's building was cut off from the rest of the compound. On November 11, 2004, Arafat died at the Percy training hospital of the Armies near Paris. He was buried in the courtyard of the Mukataa on November 12, 2004. The site still serves as the Ramallah headquarters of the Palestinian Authority, as well the official West Bank office of Mahmoud Abbas. Throughout 2005, while the Disengagement Plan was underway, some US government officials suggested to the Palestinian leadership to move the provisional capital back to Gaza, where it had been when the Palestinian Authority was first established in 1994. President Abbas, however, refrained from doing so, arguing that at this point, it was important to keep the administrative center in the West Bank in order to remind the international community that the West Bank was still awaiting a territorial solution.

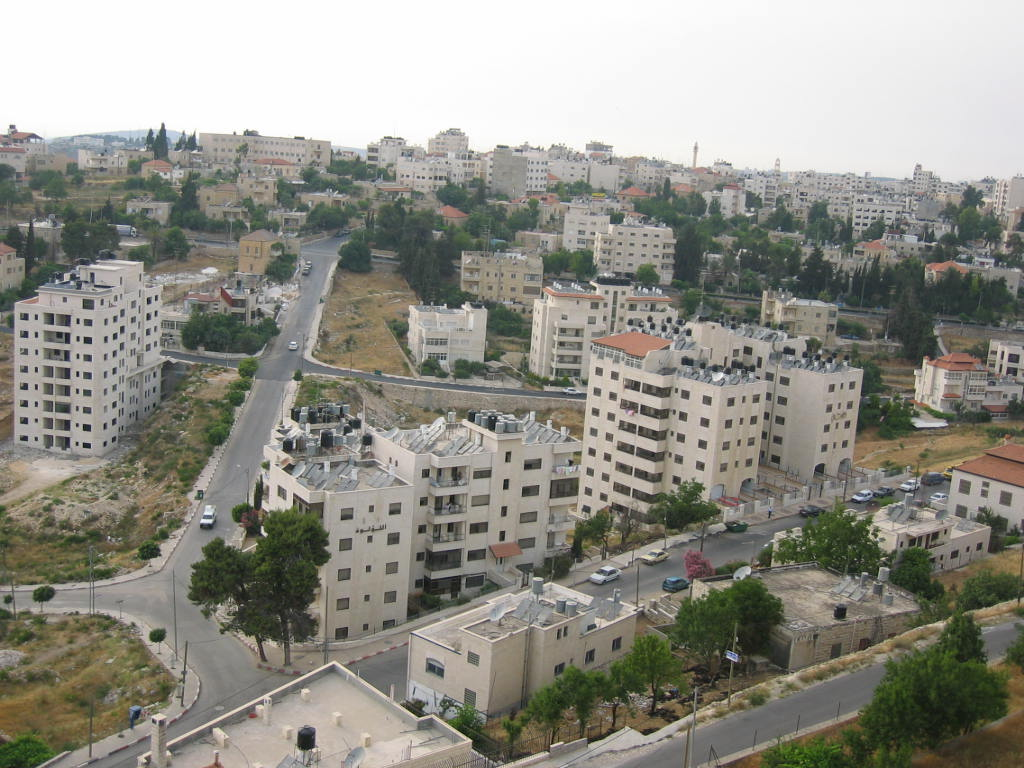
Residential neighborhood in Ramallah, 2005

In December 2005, local elections were held in Ramallah in which candidates from three different factions competed for a four-year term on the fifteen-seat municipal council. The council elected Janet Mikhail as mayor, the first woman to hold the post.

Munir Hamdan, a member of Fatah and a Ramallah businessman, discussed the concentration of government offices with a journalist. He said, "The president and prime minister have their offices here. So do the parliament and all the government ministries", representing a "collusion" between the Palestinian Authority and Israel to turn Ramallah into the political as well as the financial capital of the Palestinians. He is particularly worried by the construction of a large new governmental complex by the PA. Hatem Abdel Kader, a Jerusalem resident, Fatah legislator and former Minister for Jerusalem Affairs, complained that "If they are building a new government compound here, that means they have no plans to be based in Jerusalem... Unfortunately, the Palestinian government of Salam Fayyad has abandoned Jerusalem in favor of Ramallah." In November 2011, King Abdullah II of Jordan visited Ramallah for the first time since 2000.

== Geography and climate ==
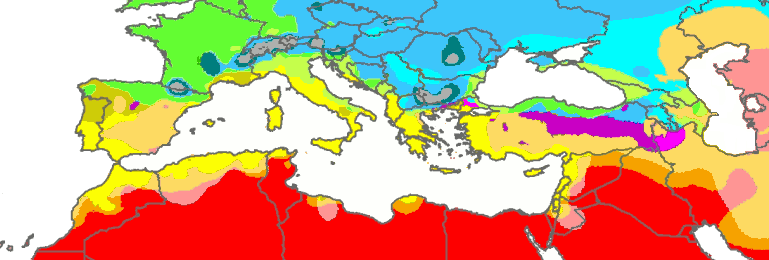
Map of Mediterranean with the Köppen Climate Classifications: Csa and Csb are noted in yellow.

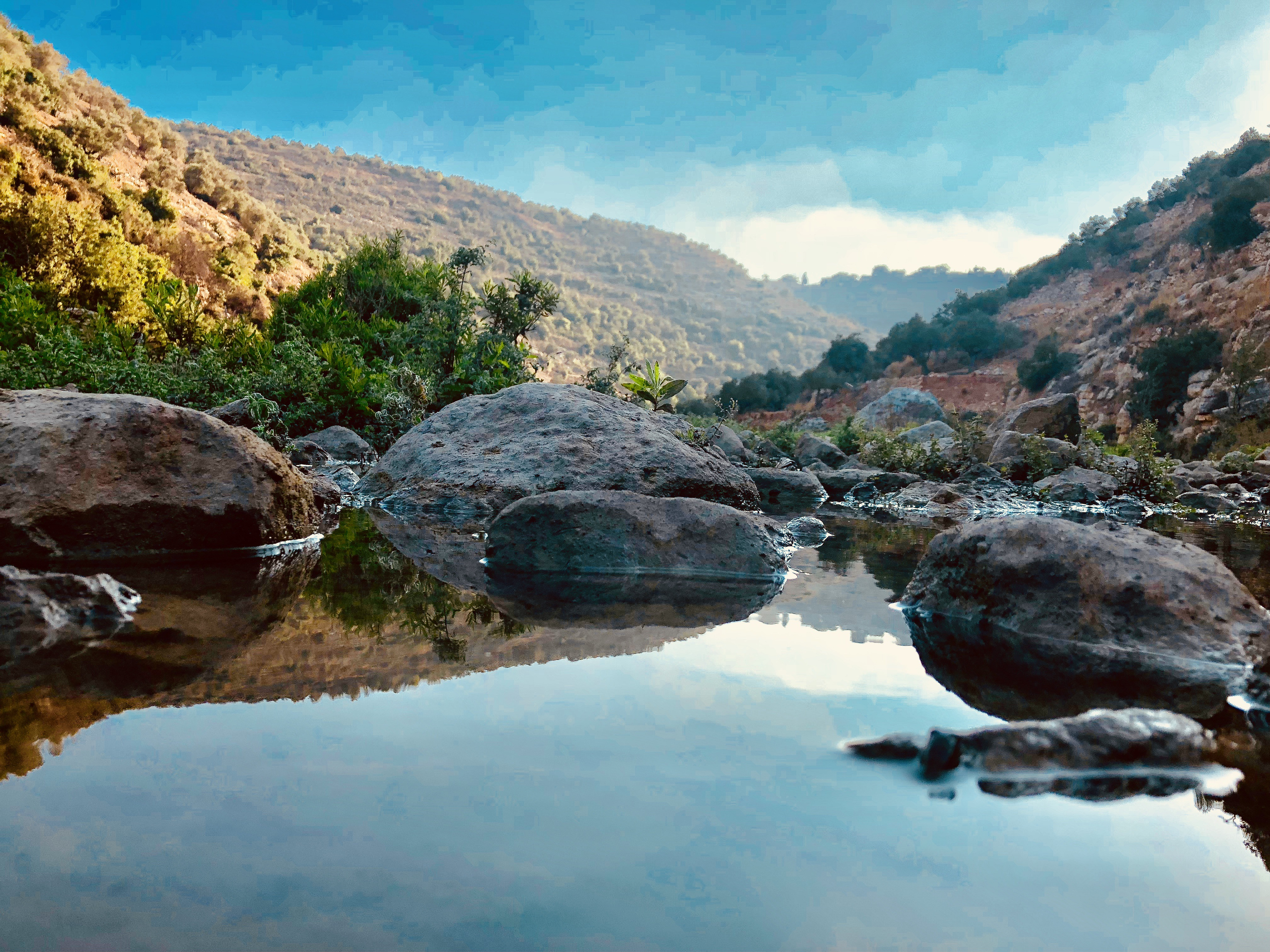
Deir Ghassana near Ramallah

This area enjoys a Mediterranean climate of a dry summer and mild, rainy winter with occasional snowfall. The recorded average of Ramallah's rainfall is about 615 mm (24 in) and minimum rainfall is 307 mm (12 in) and maximum rainfall is 1,591 mm (63 in).

The Köppen climate classification places Ramallah in the Csa category. Climates of this class generally occur on the western sides of continents between the latitudes of 30° and 45°. These climates are in the polar front region in winter, and thus have moderate temperatures and changeable, rainy weather. Summers are hot and dry, due to the domination of the subtropical high pressure systems, except in the immediate coastal areas, where summers are milder due to the nearby presence of cold ocean currents that may bring fog but prevent rain.

Climate data for Ramallah
| Month | Jan | Feb | Mar | Apr | May | Jun | Jul | Aug | Sep | Oct | Nov | Dec | Year |
|---|---|---|---|---|---|---|---|---|---|---|---|---|---|
| Record high °C (°F) | 24.0 (75.2) | 26.2 (79.2) | 31.5 (88.7) | 34.0 (93.2) | 37.3 (99.1) | 39.4 (102.9) | 37.5 (99.5) | 39.8 (103.6) | 40.0 (104.0) | 35.0 (95.0) | 29.6 (85.3) | 27.4 (81.3) | 40.0 (104.0) |
| Mean daily maximum °C (°F) | 11.8 (53.2) | 13.1 (55.6) | 16.5 (61.7) | 20.7 (69.3) | 24.7 (76.5) | 26.9 (80.4) | 28.4 (83.1) | 28.7 (83.7) | 27.2 (81.0) | 24.5 (76.1) | 19.0 (66.2) | 14.1 (57.4) | 21.3 (70.4) |
| Daily mean °C (°F) | 9.0 (48.2) | 10.2 (50.4) | 12.7 (54.9) | 16.6 (61.9) | 20.0 (68.0) | 21.9 (71.4) | 24.1 (75.4) | 23.7 (74.7) | 22.3 (72.1) | 20.1 (68.2) | 15.3 (59.5) | 10.7 (51.3) | 17.2 (63.0) |
| Mean daily minimum °C (°F) | 6.9 (44.4) | 7.5 (45.5) | 9.6 (49.3) | 12.7 (54.9) | 15.9 (60.6) | 18.1 (64.6) | 19.6 (67.3) | 19.8 (67.6) | 18.6 (65.5) | 16.8 (62.2) | 13.0 (55.4) | 8.8 (47.8) | 13.9 (57.1) |
| Record low °C (°F) | −2.0 (28.4) | −1.4 (29.5) | −0.6 (30.9) | 2.8 (37.0) | 8.5 (47.3) | 11.4 (52.5) | 14.8 (58.6) | 16.0 (60.8) | 14.0 (57.2) | 6.0 (42.8) | 3.0 (37.4) | −0.6 (30.9) | −2.0 (28.4) |
| Average precipitation mm (inches) | 165 (6.5) | 137 (5.4) | 103 (4.1) | 37 (1.5) | 8 (0.3) | 0 (0) | 0 (0) | 0 (0) | 5 (0.2) | 20 (0.8) | 72 (2.8) | 171 (6.7) | 718 (28.3) |
| Average rainy days | 9.7 | 9.7 | 6.3 | 3.2 | 1.4 | 0.3 | 0.0 | 0.0 | 0.7 | 2.5 | 5.1 | 7.4 | 46.3 |
| Average relative humidity (%) | 79.5 | 72.2 | 70.1 | 59.1 | 57.7 | 62.8 | 63.0 | 74.0 | 72.4 | 68.9 | 69.5 | 77.7 | 68.9 |
| Mean monthly sunshine hours | 176.7 | 169.5 | 220.1 | 267.0 | 325.5 | 357.0 | 372.0 | 350.3 | 297.0 | 263.5 | 213.0 | 182.9 | 3,194.5 |
| Mean daily sunshine hours | 5.7 | 6.0 | 7.1 | 8.9 | 10.5 | 11.9 | 12.0 | 11.3 | 9.9 | 8.5 | 7.1 | 5.9 | 8.7 |
Source 1: Palestinian Meteorological Department
Source 2: Arab Meteorology Book (precipitation)

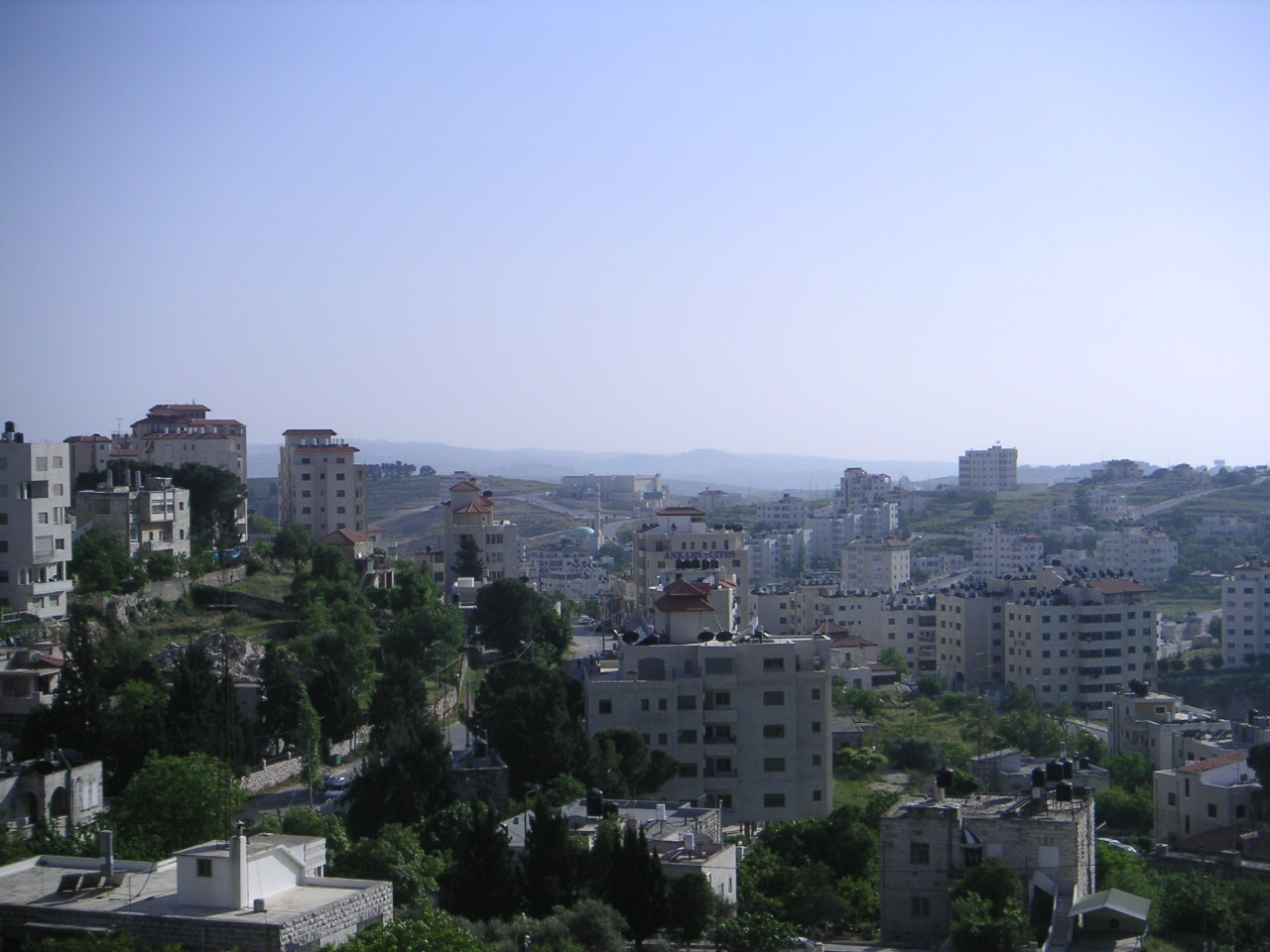
A view from Ramallah

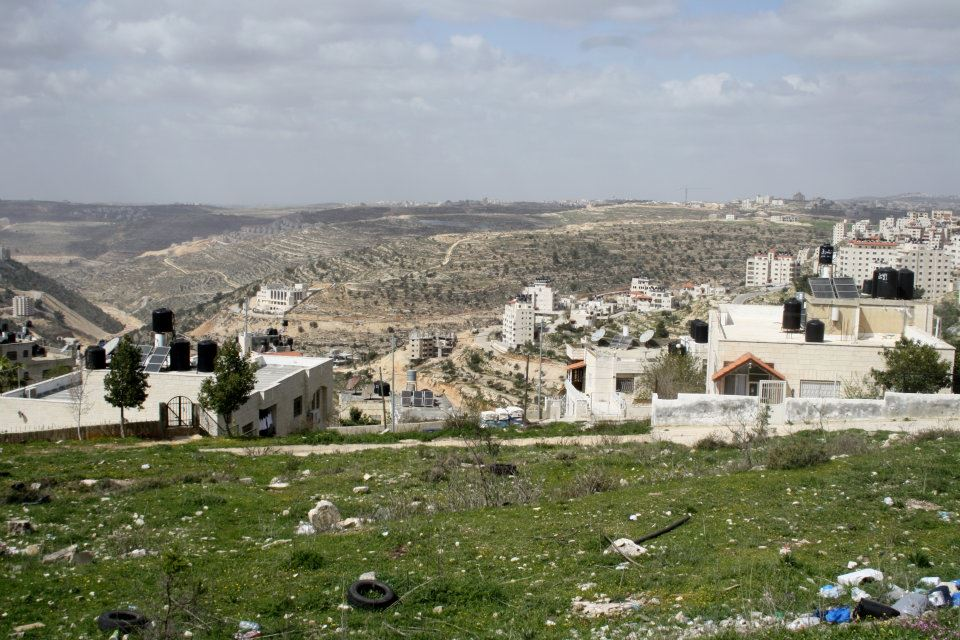
Hills surrounding Ramallah

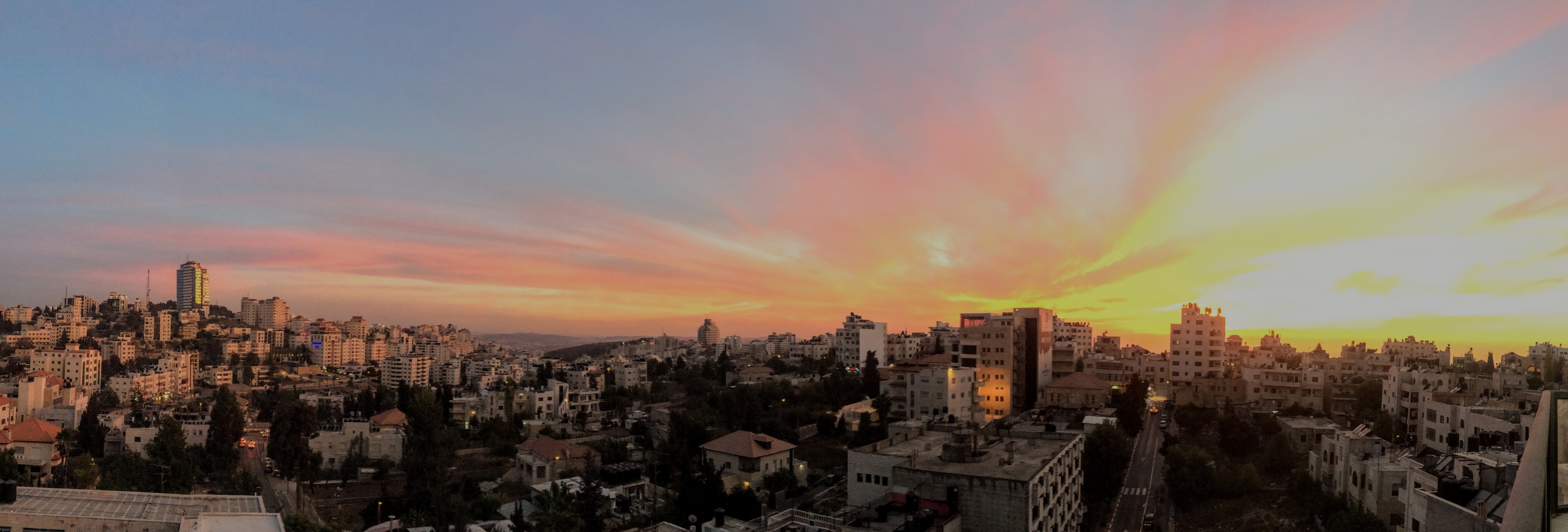
Sunset in Ramallah

== Economy ==
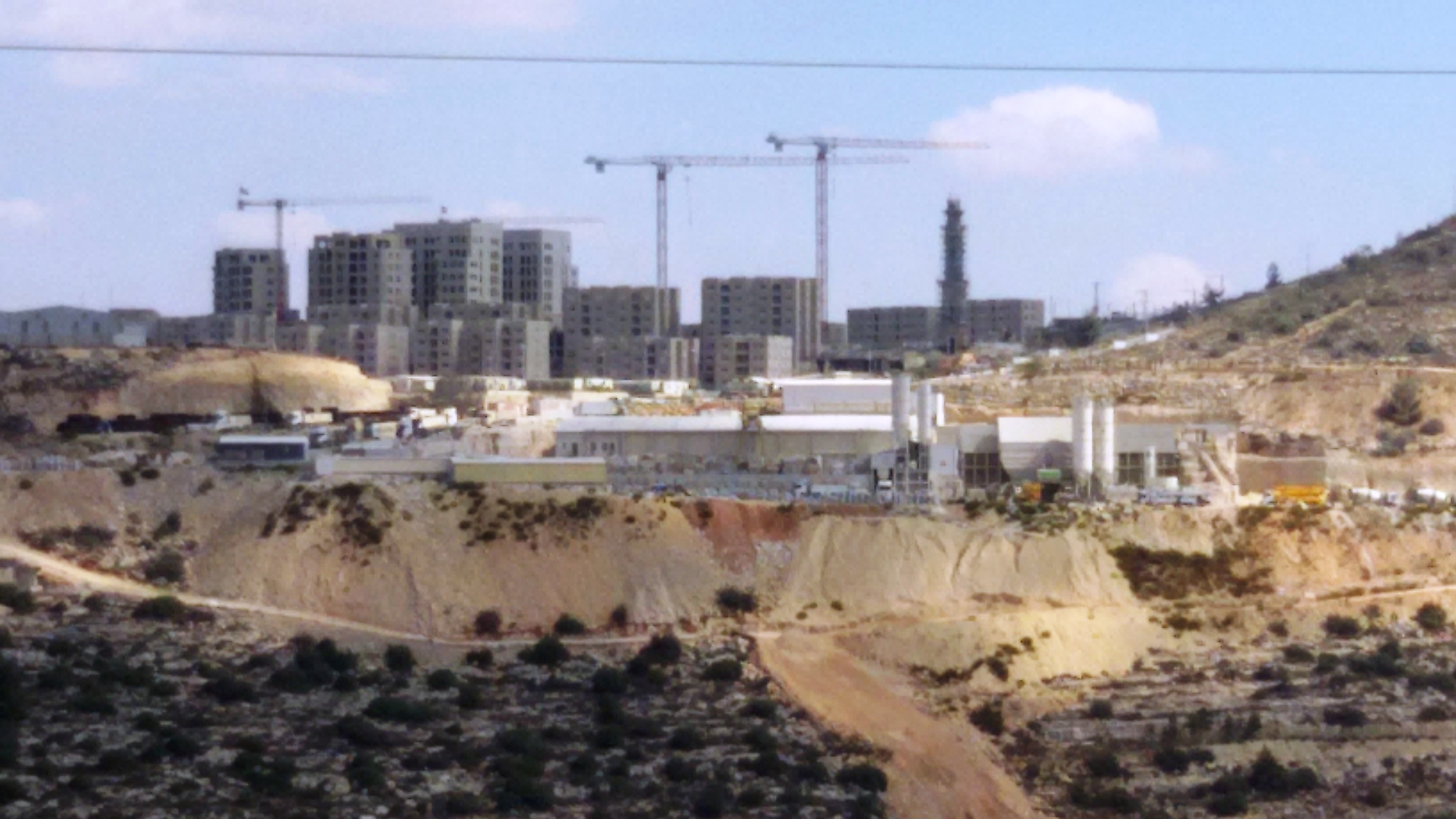
Construction of Rawabi and industrial area

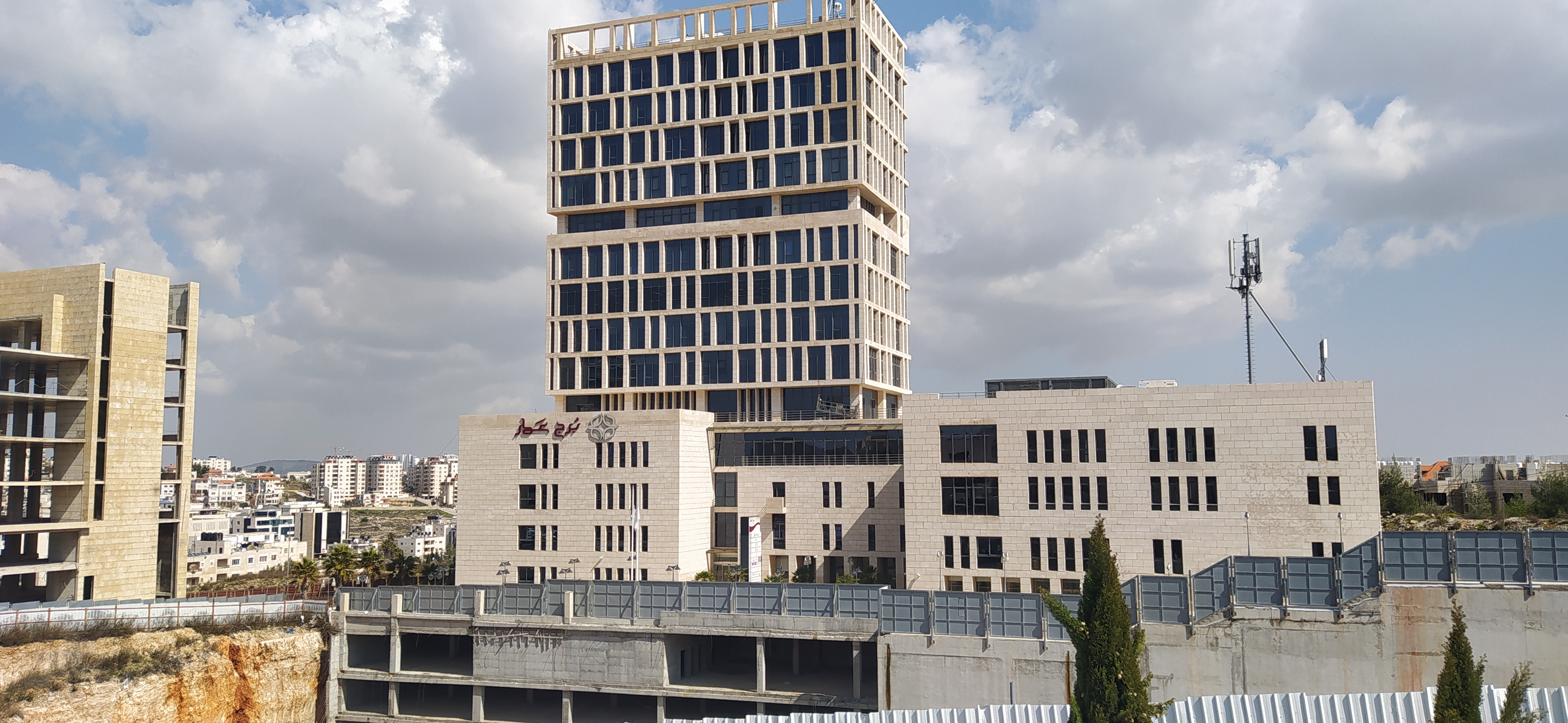
Ammar Tower in Ramallah

Ramallah is the financial and commercial center of the Palestinian Authority, and is home to the country's numerous financial institutions. Currently, Ramallah is the seat of power of the Palestinian Authority, with most of its offices located within the city. The city also serves as the headquarters for most international NGOs and embassies. Hundreds of millions of dollars in aid flowing into the city have greatly boosted Ramallah's economy since the end of the Second Intifada. Ramallah's buoyant economy continues to draw Palestinians from other West Bank towns where jobs are fewer. The built-up area has grown fivefold since 2002.

Construction boom is one of the most obvious signs of West Bank economic growth, estimated at an annual rate of 8 percent. This has been attributed to relative stability and Western donor support to the Palestinian Authority. The PIF have begun work on a $400 million commercial center comprising 13 towers which will be some of the tallest in Ramallah. The Ersal Commercial Center has drawn investment from a Saudi Arabian firm, The Land Holding, which has a 10% stake. It is not the only Gulf Arab firm investing in Ramallah and its outskirts. The Qatari Diar Real Estate Investment Company has a stake in Rawabi, a completely new town being constructed in the hills outside Ramallah at a cost of $1 billion.

Ramallah has highest concentration of high-tech companies. ASAL technologies, an information technology company in Ramallah, has 120 employees and is looking forward to "exponential growth". In collaboration with the Republic of India, a new tech park named, the India Palestine Techno Park is located in Birzeit. Apple Inc operates a research & development center in Rawabi with ASAL Technologies. A large number multinational companies operates facilities in Ramallah, which outsource Palestinians.

By 2010, Ramallah had become the leading center of economic and political activity in the territories under the control of the Palestinian Authority. During a building boom in the early years of the 21st century, apartment buildings and "five-star" hotels were erected, particularly in the Al-Masyoun neighborhood. In 2010, "more than one hundred" Palestinian businesses were reported to have moved to Ramallah from East Jerusalem, because "Here they pay less taxes and have more customers." One local boasted to a journalist that "Ramallah is becoming the de facto capital of Palestine." This boast was seconded by The New York Times which, in 2010, called Ramallah the "de facto capital of the West Bank". According to Sani Meo, the publisher of This Week in Palestine, "Capital or no capital, Ramallah has done well and Palestine is proud of its achievements." Some Palestinians allege that Ramallah's prosperity is part of an Israeli "conspiracy" to make the city the capital of a Palestinian state instead of Jerusalem.

== Demographics ==
Historical population
| Year | Pop. | ±% |
|---|---|---|
| 1896 | 2,061 | — |
| 1922 | 3,104 | +50.6% |
| 1931 | 4,286 | +38.1% |
| 1938 | 4,900 | +14.3% |
| 1945 | 5,080 | +3.7% |
| 1961 | 14,759 | +190.5% |
| 1967 | 12,134 | −17.8% |
| 1997 | 17,851 | +47.1% |
| 2007 | 27,460 | +53.8% |
| 2017 | 38,998 | +42.0% |

An Ottoman village list of about 1870 showed that Ramallah had 249 houses and a population of 635, though the population count included men only. The village was described as being in the Bire area, "north of Mikhmas, on a rocky hill." In 1896, the population of Ramallah was estimated to be about 2,061 persons.

In the 1922 census of Palestine conducted by the British Mandate authorities, Ramallah had a population of 3,104 (2,972 Christians, 125 Muslims, and seven Jews), the Christians consisting of 2,162 Orthodox, 1 Syriac Orthodox (Jacobite), 332 Roman Catholics, 144 Greek Catholic (Melkite Catholic), 211 Church of England, and 122 "other". The population increased at the time of the 1931 census to 4,286 (3,766 Christians, 519 Muslims and one Jew) in a total of 1,014 houses. In the 1938 village statistics, the population is listed as 4,900. In the 1945 statistics, the population stood at 5,080, with Christians forming the majority of the population (4,440 Christians and 640 Muslims).

However, the demographic makeup of the town changed drastically under Jordanian occupation, when considerable emigration of Christians took place. This left slightly more than half of the city's 12,134 inhabitants Christian by 1967, and the remainder Muslim.

Ramallah expatriates created one of the largest Arab communities in the United States, settling mainly in Washington, New York, Florida, California, Texas, and especially in Michigan. Many worked in the auto industry. In 1959, the American Federation of Ramallah, Palestine (AFRP) was established in Detroit. The AFRP has several branches in the United States, and holds an annual convention every summer attended by a sizable number of former Ramallah residents and their offspring.

Ramallah's population drastically decreased in the late 20th century from 24,722 inhabitants in 1987 to 17,851 in 1997. In the Palestinian Central Bureau of Statistics (PCBS) census in 1997, Palestinian refugees accounted for 60.3% of the population, which was 17,851. There were 8,622 males and 9,229 females. People younger than 20 years of age made up 45.9% of the population, while those aged between 20 and 64 were 45.4%, and residents aged over 64 constituted 4.7%.

Only in 2005 did the population reach more than 24,000. In a PCBS projection in 2006, Ramallah had a population of 25,467 inhabitants. In the 2007 PCBS census, there were 27,460 people living in the city. Sources vary about the current Christian population in the city, ranging around 25%.

== Health ==
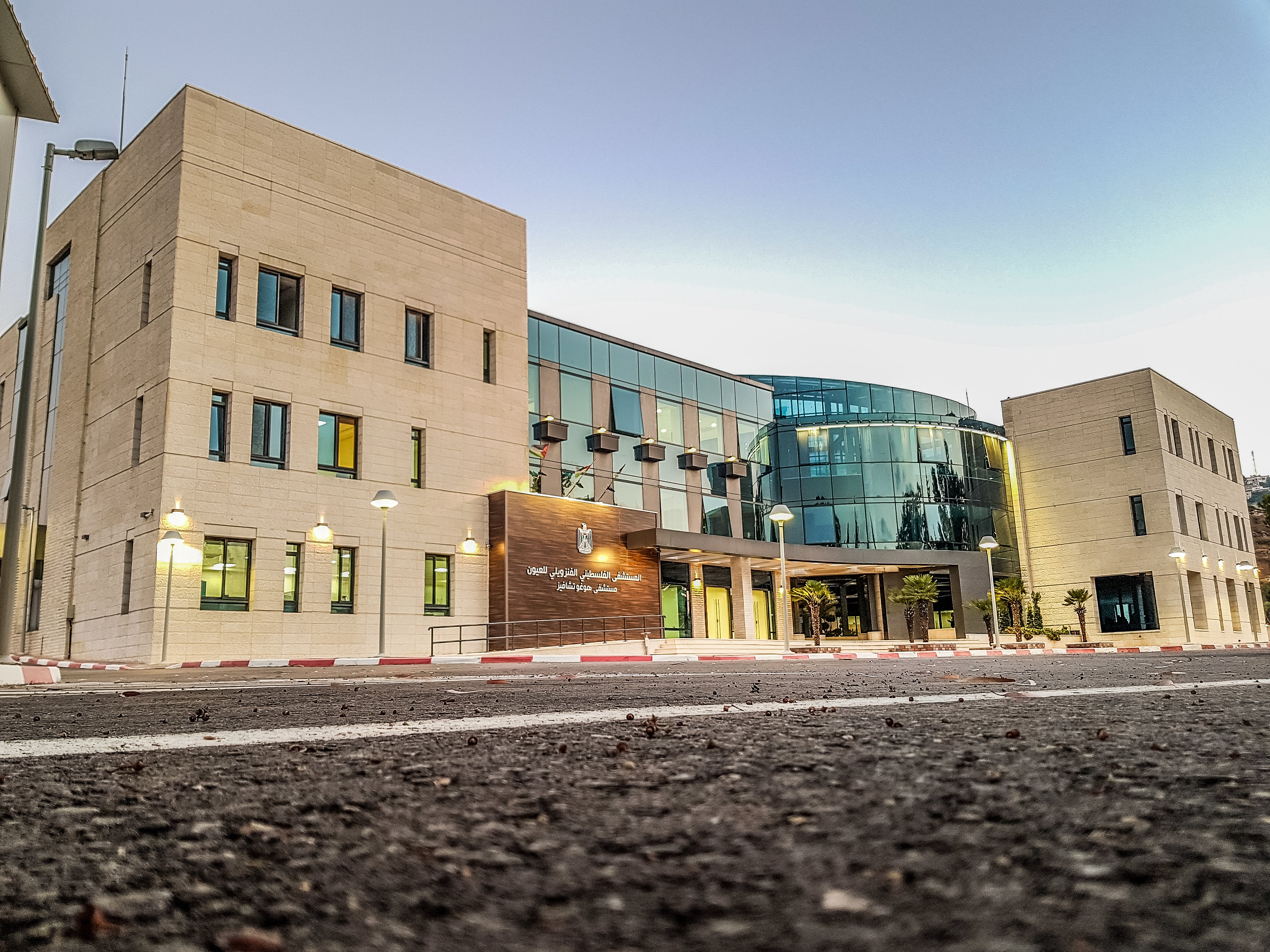
Hugo Chávez Hospital in Ramallah

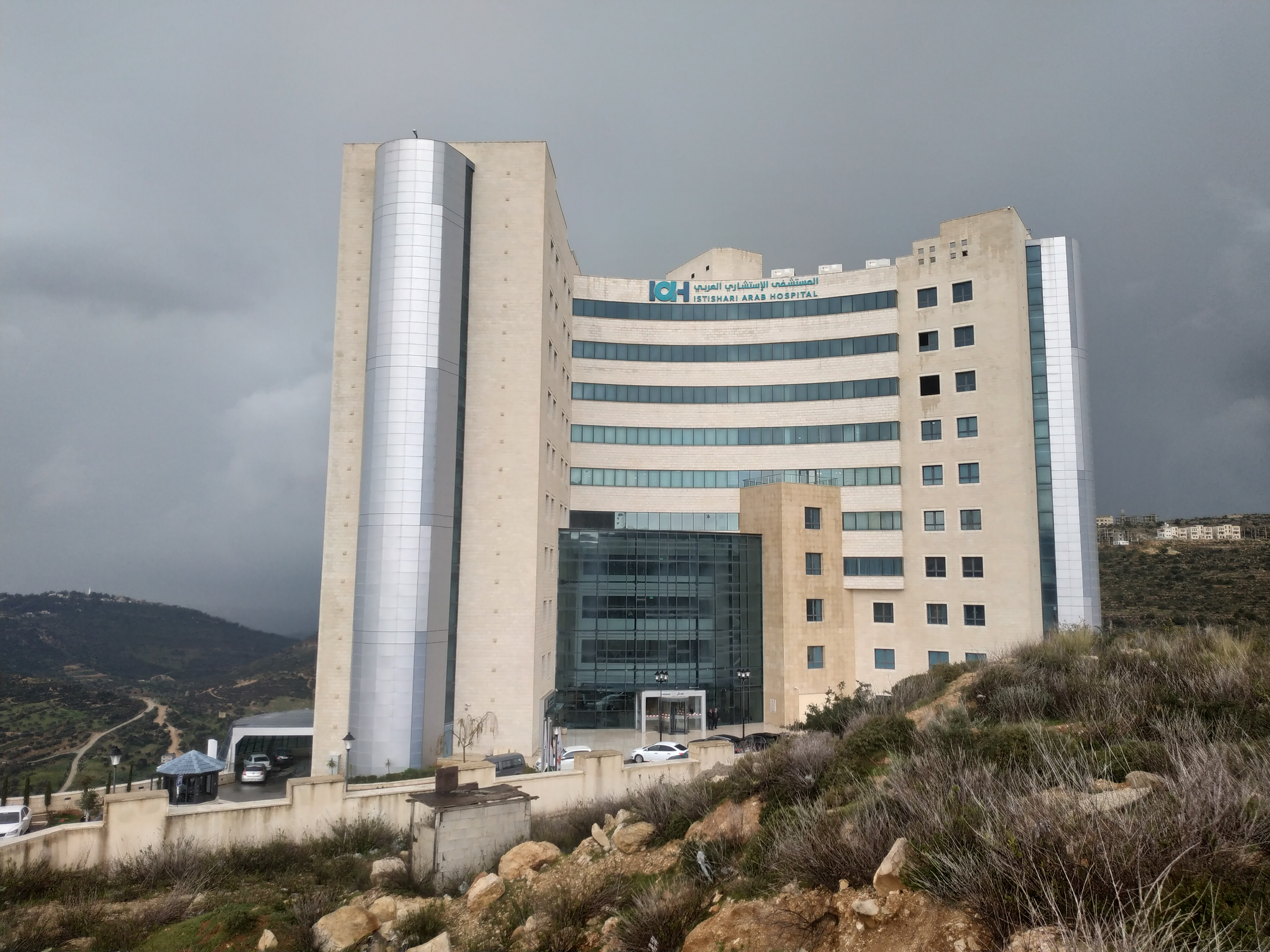
Istishari Arab Hospital

In the aftermath of the 1936–1939 Arab revolt, the Ramallah Hospital Foundation was established and registered as a tax exempt organization in New York in 1944. It bought large pieces of land in the south-eastern fringes of the city dedicated for the future hospital. In 1963, a hospital was opened.

== Religion ==
The Jamal Abdel Nasser Mosque is one of the city's largest mosques. The Orthodox Church of Ramallah, an Orthodox Christian convent, Melkite Catholic Church, Evangelical Lutheran Church, Arab Episcopal (Anglican) Church, Ramallah Local Church (Evangelical/Born Again) and Ramallah Baptist Church all operate schools in the city.

=== Christian presence ===
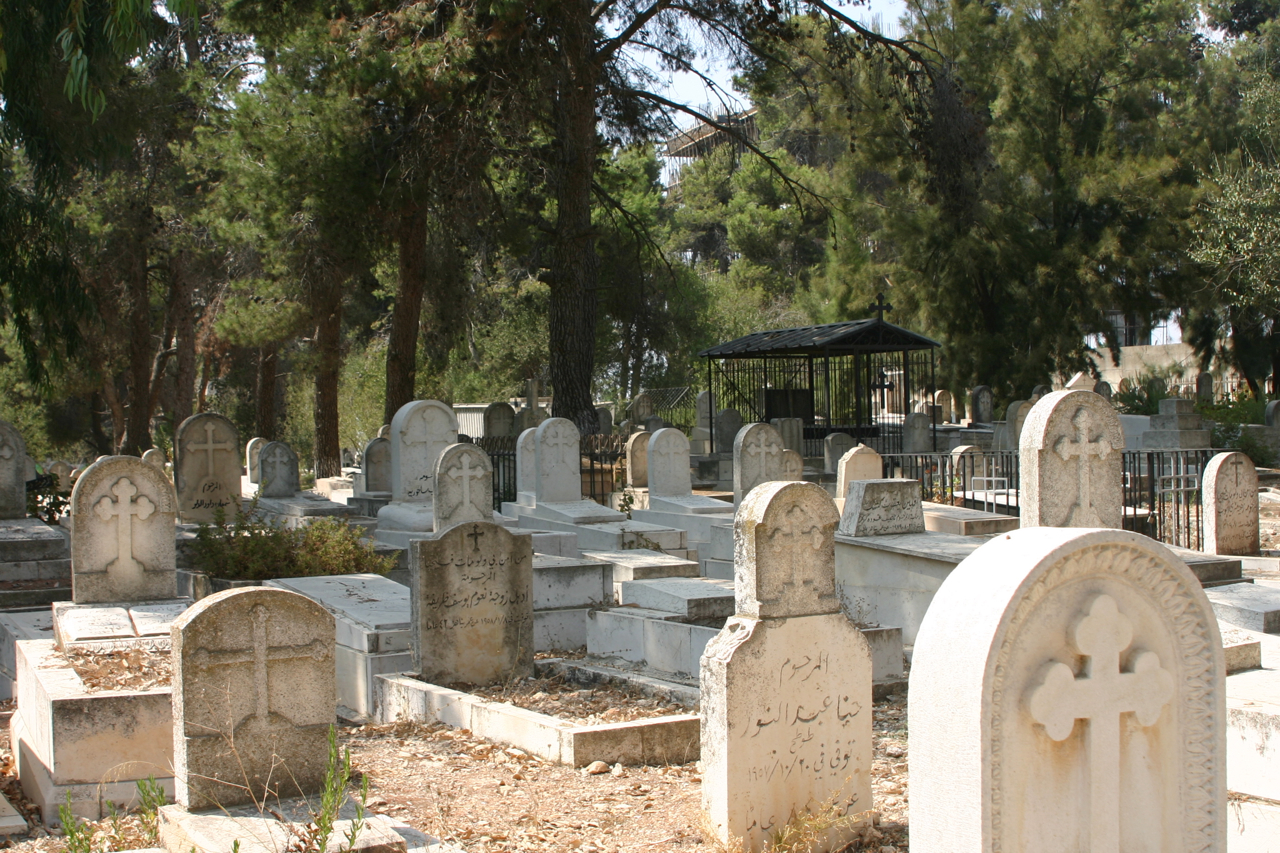
An old Christian cemetery in Ramallah

Ramallah grew dramatically throughout the 17th and 18th centuries as an agricultural village, attracting more (predominantly Christian) inhabitants from all around the region. In 1700, Yacoub Elias was the first Ramallah native to be ordained by the Greek Orthodox Church of Jerusalem, the Christian denomination that prevailed in the Holy Land at the time. In the early 19th century, the first Jerusalemite Greek Orthodox Christian church was built. Later, in 1852, the Greek Orthodox Church of the Transfiguration, was built to replace it; it is the sole Eastern Orthodox Church in Ramallah today.

There is also a Melkite Greek Catholic Church in Ramallah, built in 1895. The Roman Catholic Church also established its presence in Ramallah the 19th century and constitutes today the second-largest Christian denomination in the city. The Roman Catholic Church established the St. Joseph's Girls' School run by St. Joseph sisters, as well as the co-educational Al-Ahliyyah College high school run by Rosary sisters. In 1913, construction of the Catholic Holy Family Church was started.

As of 2022, Ramallah also has a Coptic Orthodox Church, an Evangelical Lutheran Church and an Episcopalian (Anglican) Church. In the 19th century, the Religious Society of Friends (Quakers) established a presence in Ramallah and built the Ramallah Friends Schools, one for girls and later a boys' school, to alleviate the dearth of education for women and girls. Eli and Sybil Jones opened "The Girls Training Home of Ramallah" in 1869. A medical clinic was established in 1883, with Dr. George Hassenauer serving as the first doctor in Ramallah. In 1889, the girls academy became the Friends Girls School (FGS). As the FGS was also a boarding school, it attracted a number of girls from surrounding communities, including Jerusalem, Lydda, Jaffa, and Beirut. The Friends Boys School (FBS) was founded in 1901 and opened in 1918. The Quakers opened a Friends Meeting House for worship in the city center in 1910. According to the school's official website, most high school students choose to take the International Baccalaureate exams (IBE) instead of the traditional "Tawjihi" university exams.

The activity of foreign churches in Palestine in the late 19th century increased awareness of prosperity in the West. In Ramallah and Bethlehem, a few miles south, local residents began to seek economic opportunity overseas. In 1901, merchants from Ramallah emigrated to the United States and established import-export businesses, selling handmade rugs and other exotic wares across the Atlantic. Increased trade dramatically improved living standards for Ramallah's inhabitants. American cars, mechanized farming equipment, radios, and later televisions became attainable luxuries for upper-class families. As residents of Jaffa and Lydda moved to Ramallah, the balance of Muslims and Christians began to change.

In the 21st century, a large community of people with direct descent from the Haddadins who founded Ramallah live in the United States. The town is now predominately Muslim, but still contains a Christian minority. The change in demographics is due mostly to new migration of Muslims to the area, and emigration of Christians from the area.

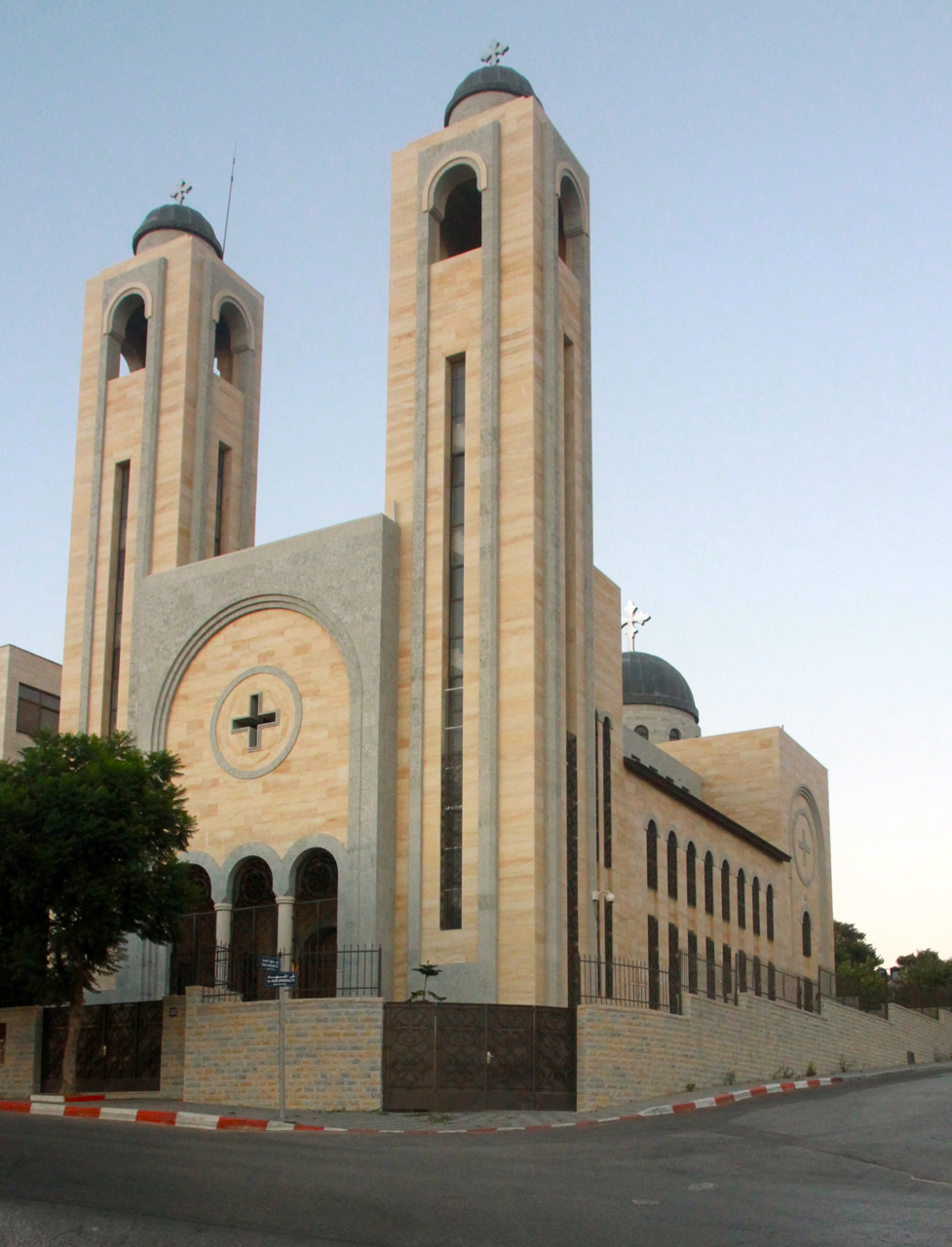
A Coptic church

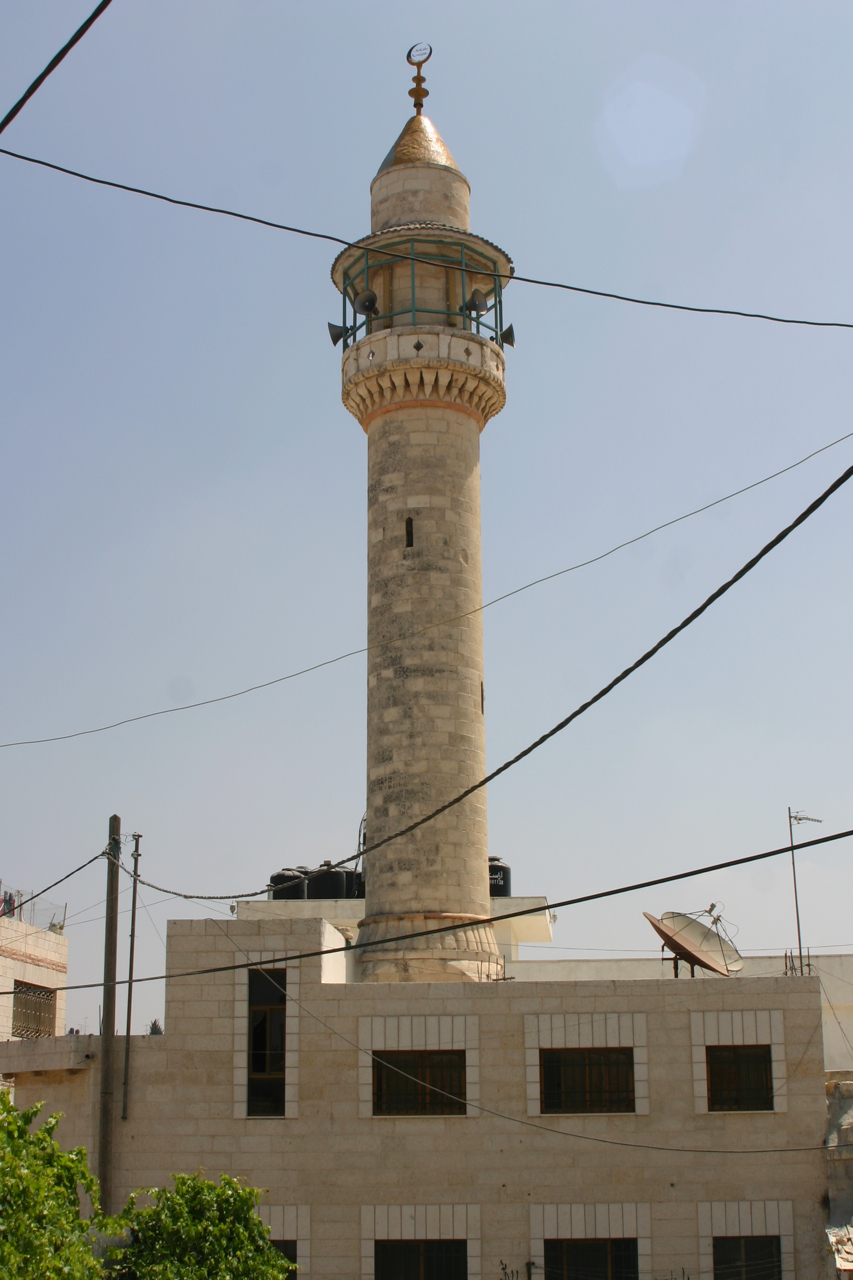
A local mosque

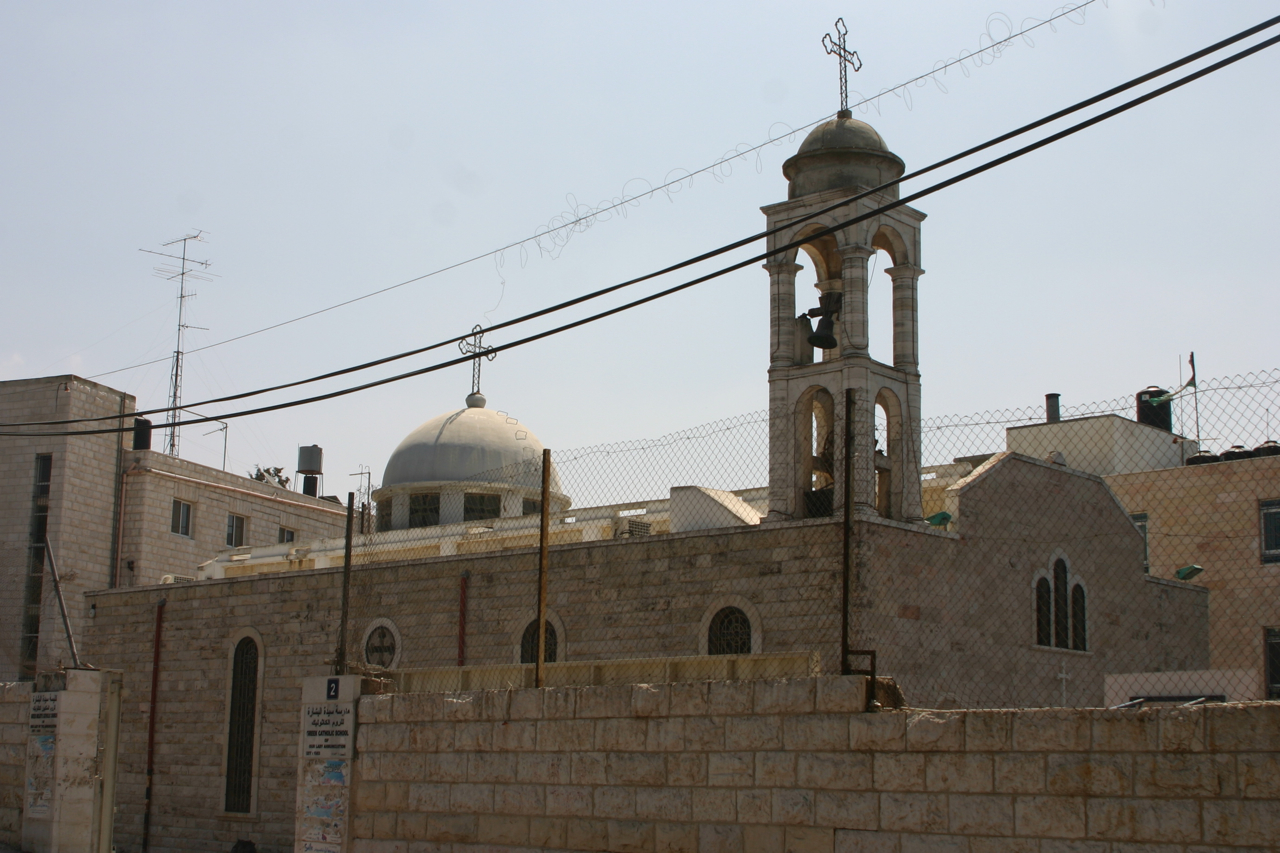
Church of Our Lady of the Annunciation

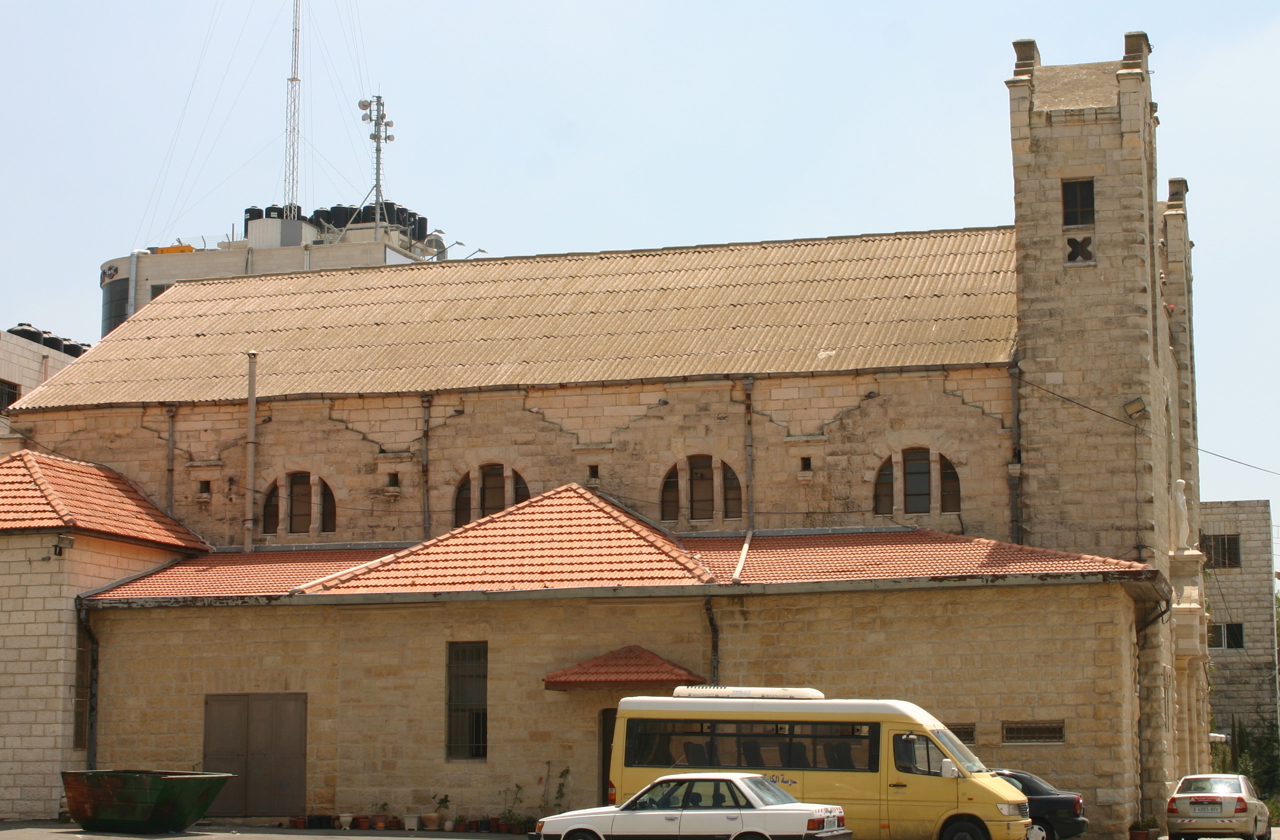
Holy Family Church

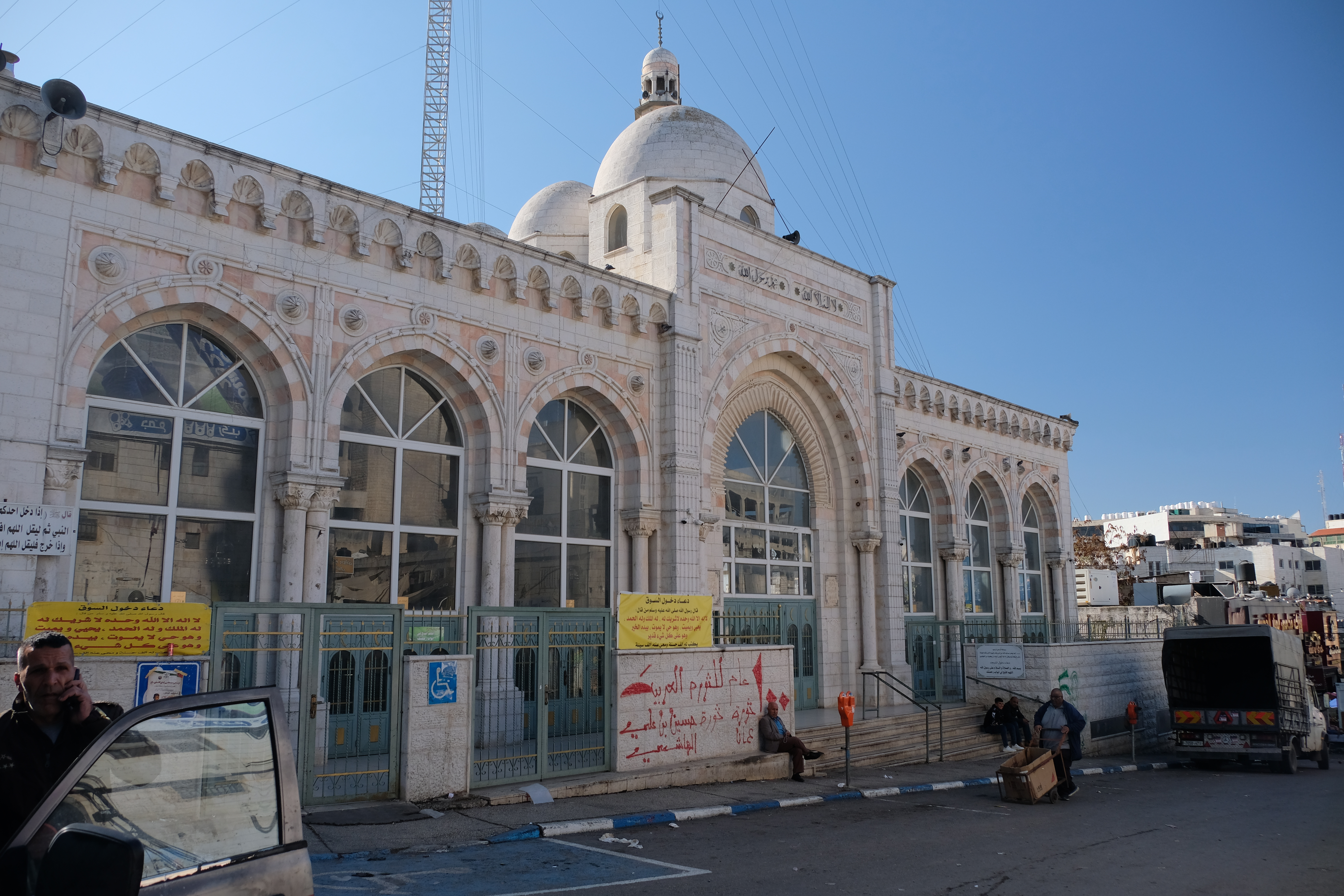
Jamal Abdel Nasser Mosque

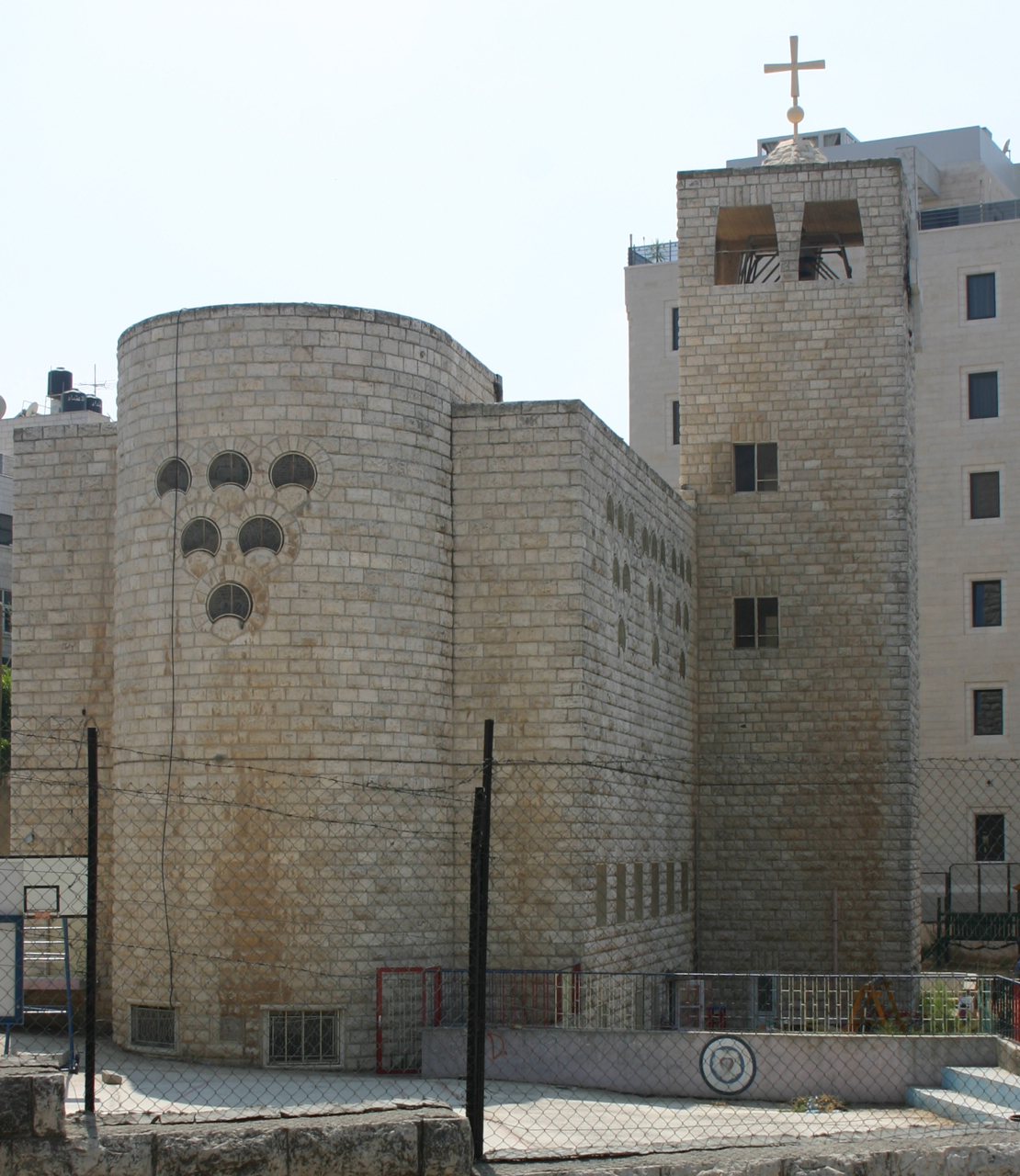
Evangelical Lutheran Church of Hope

== Culture ==
Ramallah is generally considered the most affluent and cultural, as well as the most liberal, of all Palestinian cities, and is home to a number of popular Palestinian activists, poets, artists, and musicians.

In 2004, the Ramallah Cultural Palace opened in the city. The only cultural center of its kind in the Palestinian-governed areas, it houses a 736-seat auditorium, as well as conference rooms, exhibit halls, and movie-screening rooms. It was a joint venture of the Palestinian Authority, the United Nations Development Programme (UNDP), and the Japanese government. Ramallah hosted its first annual international film festival in 2004.

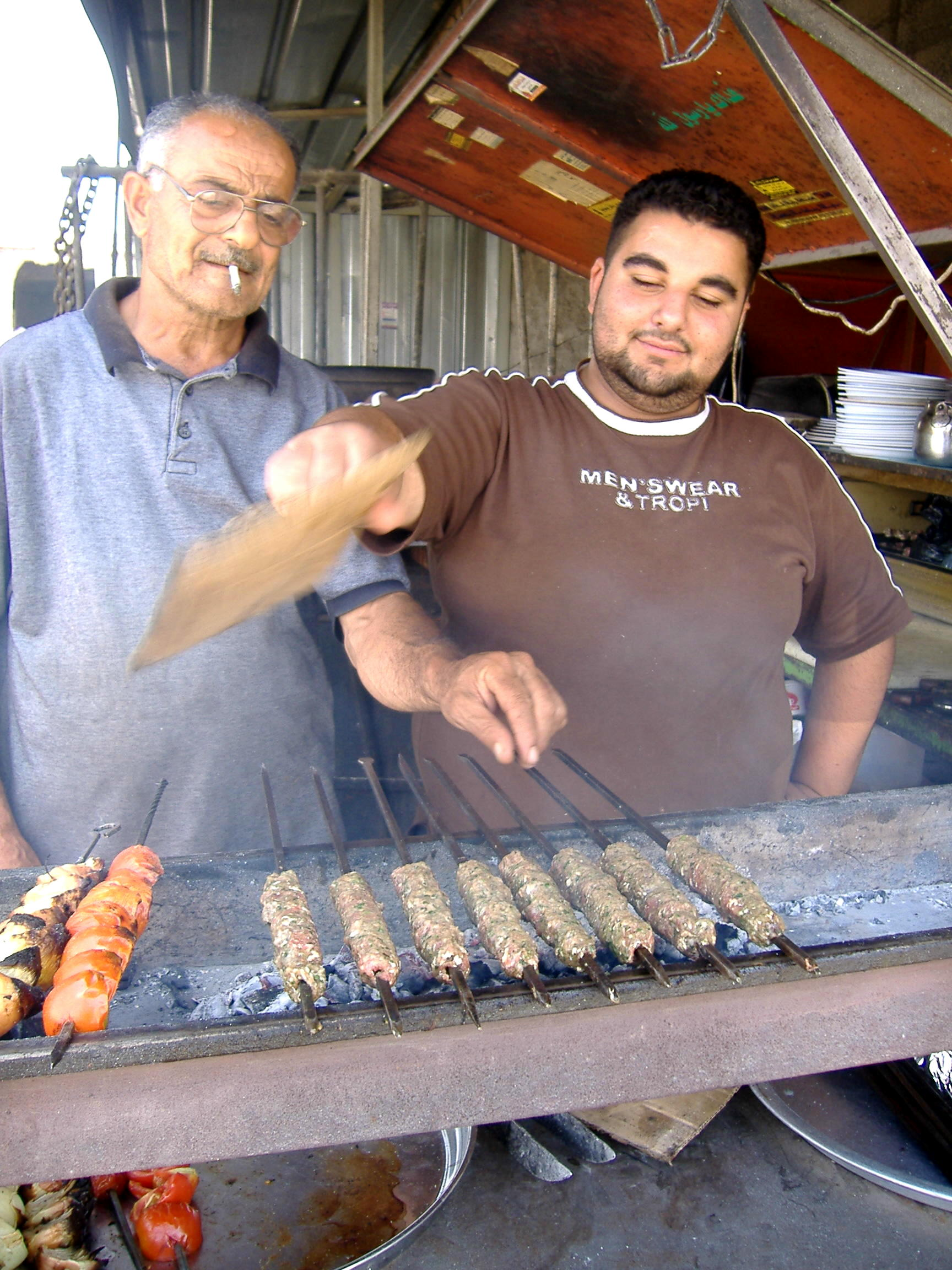
Kebab stand in Ramallah

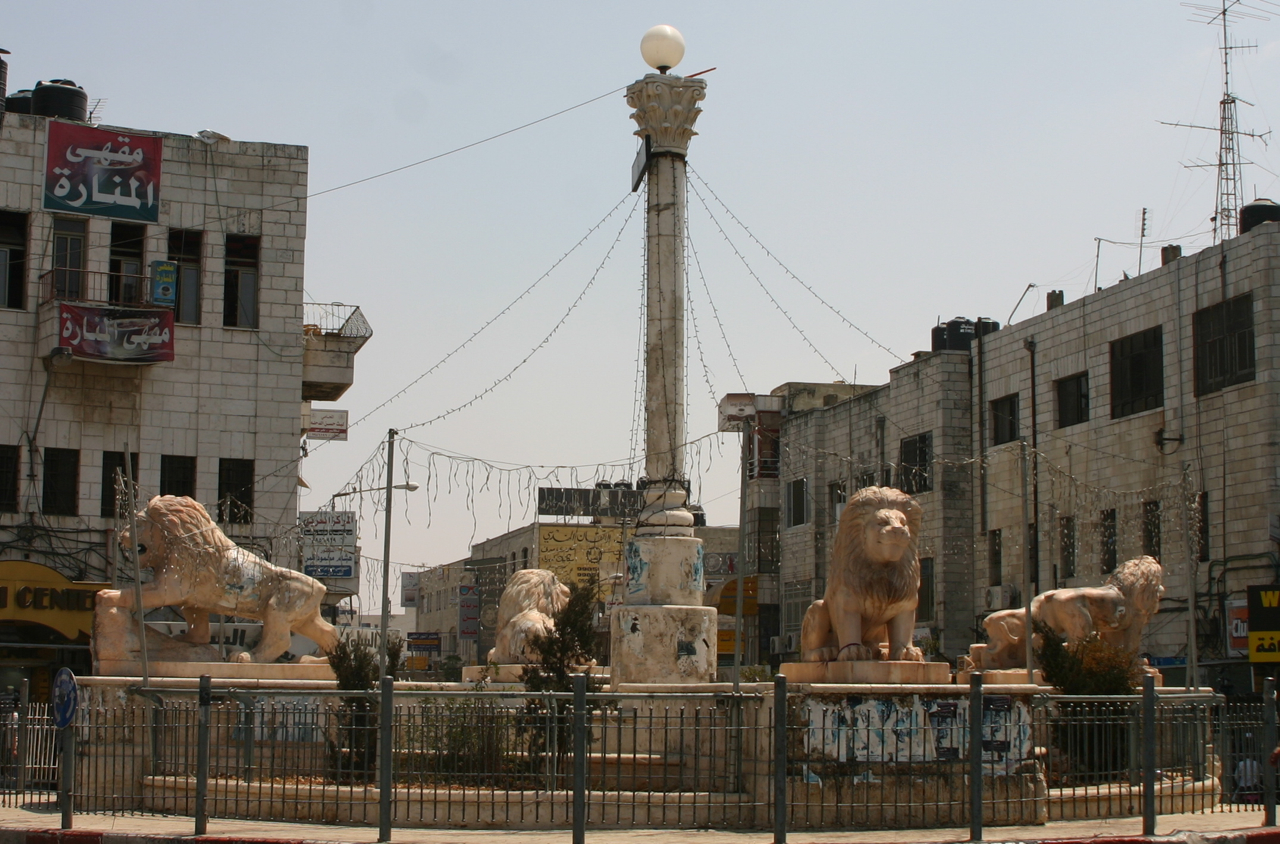
Lion sculptures in Ramallah's central square

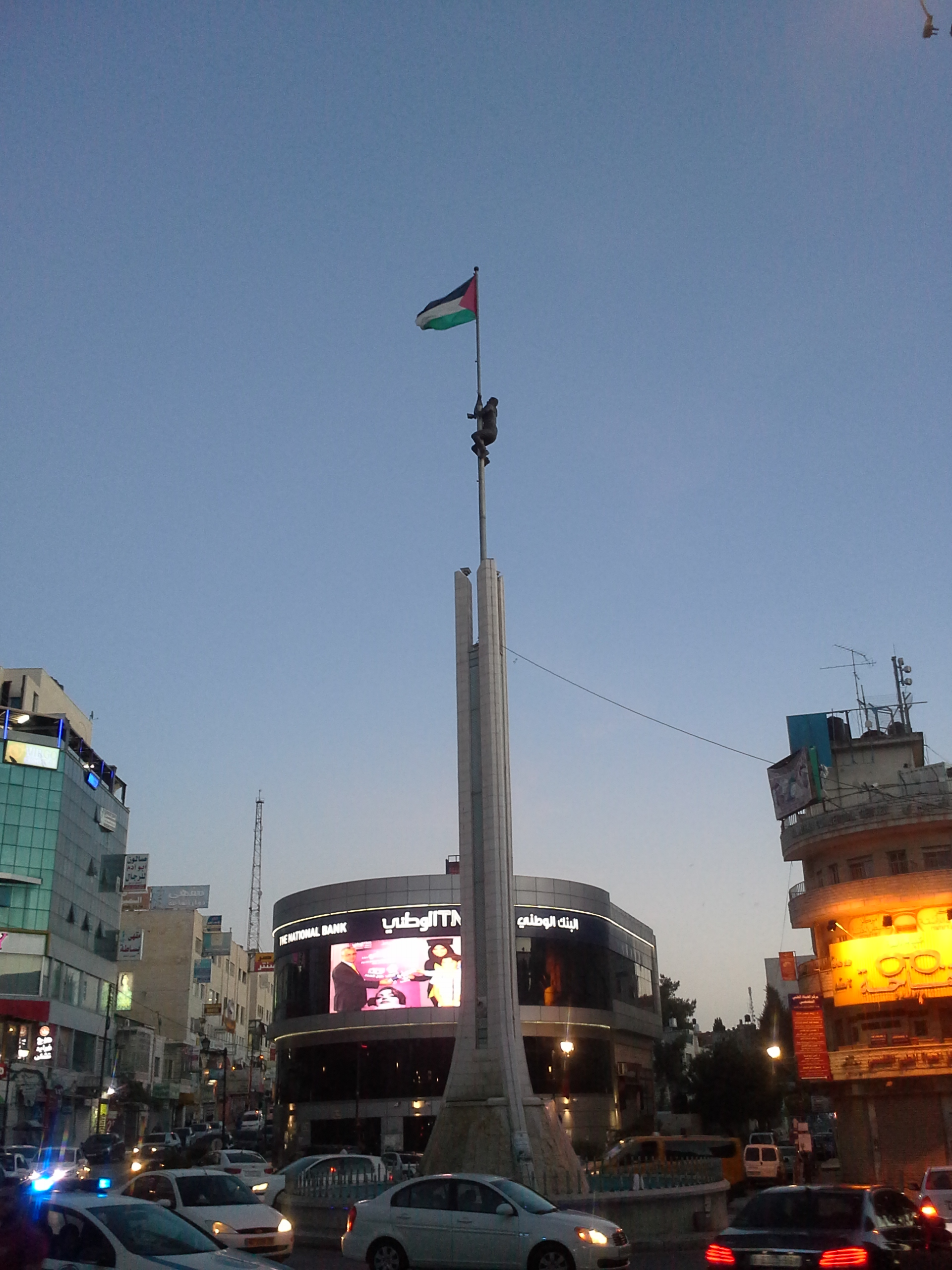
Monument and Palestinian flag at Al Sa’a Square/Yasser Arafat Square

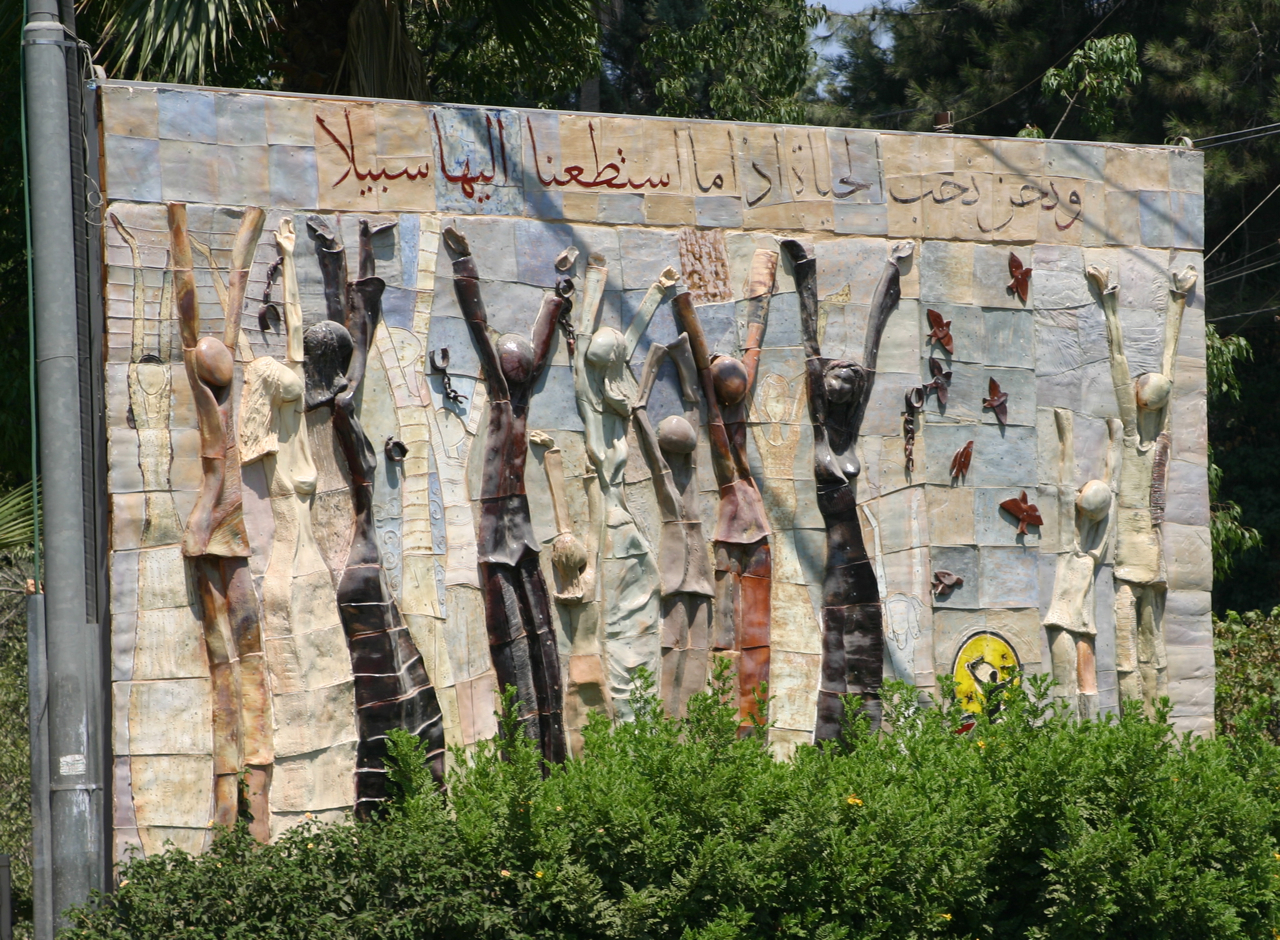
Ceramic mural

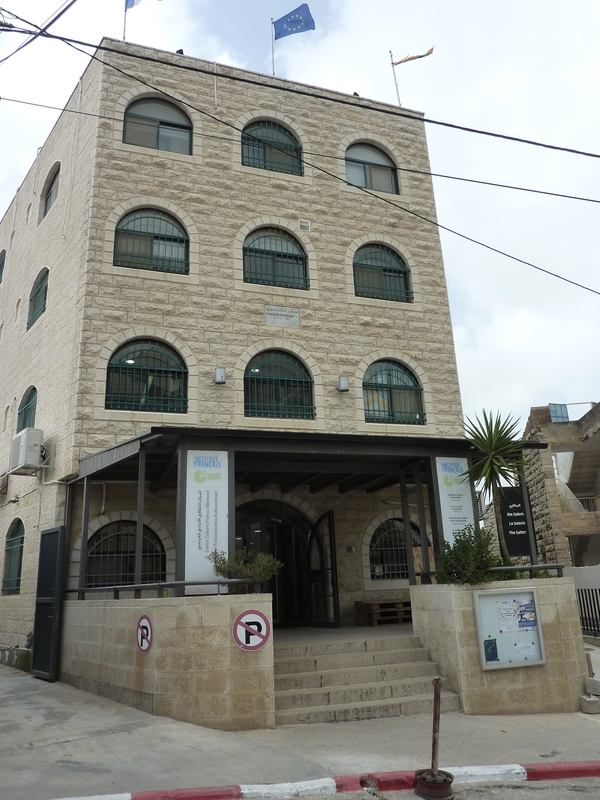
French-German Cultural Center

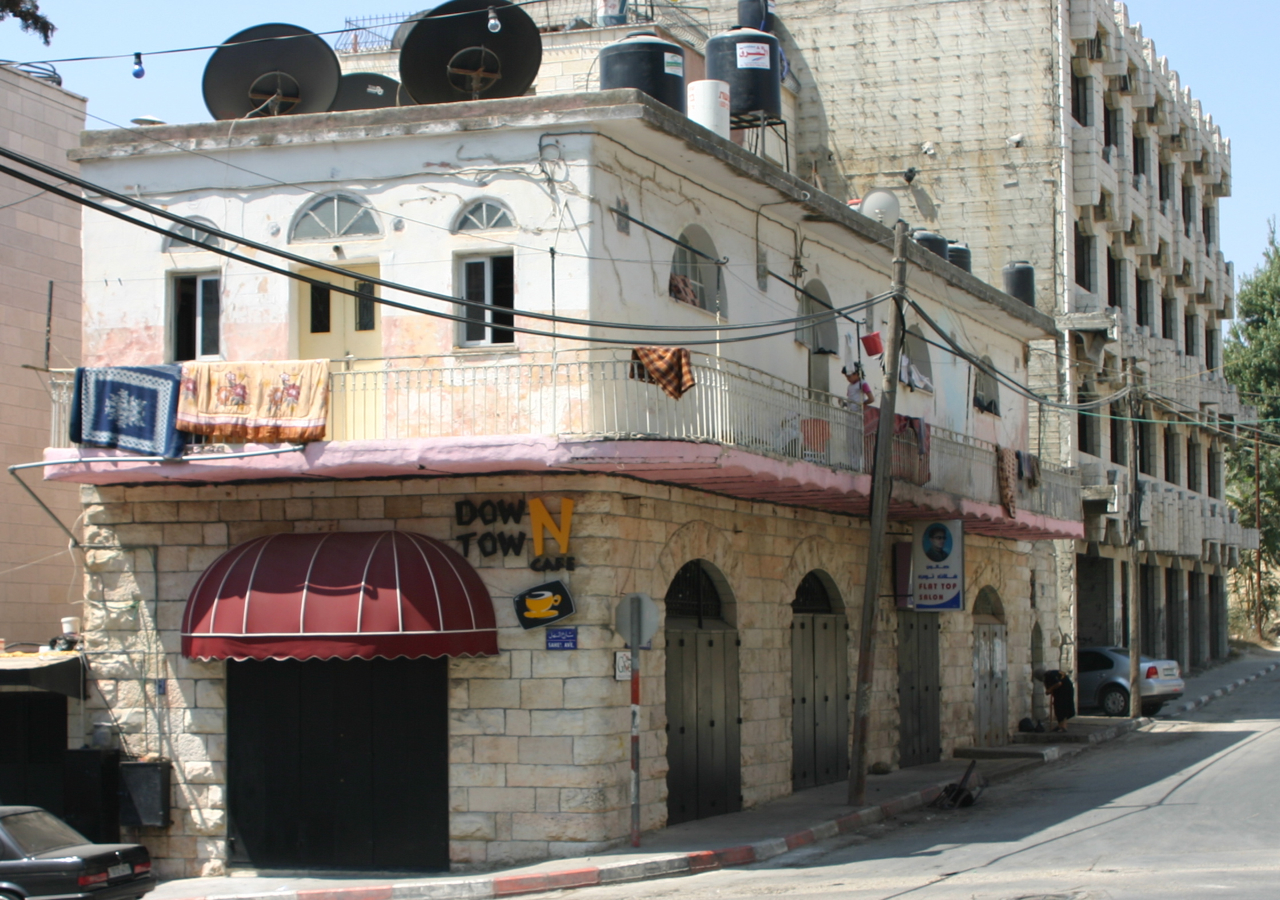
DownTown Cafe

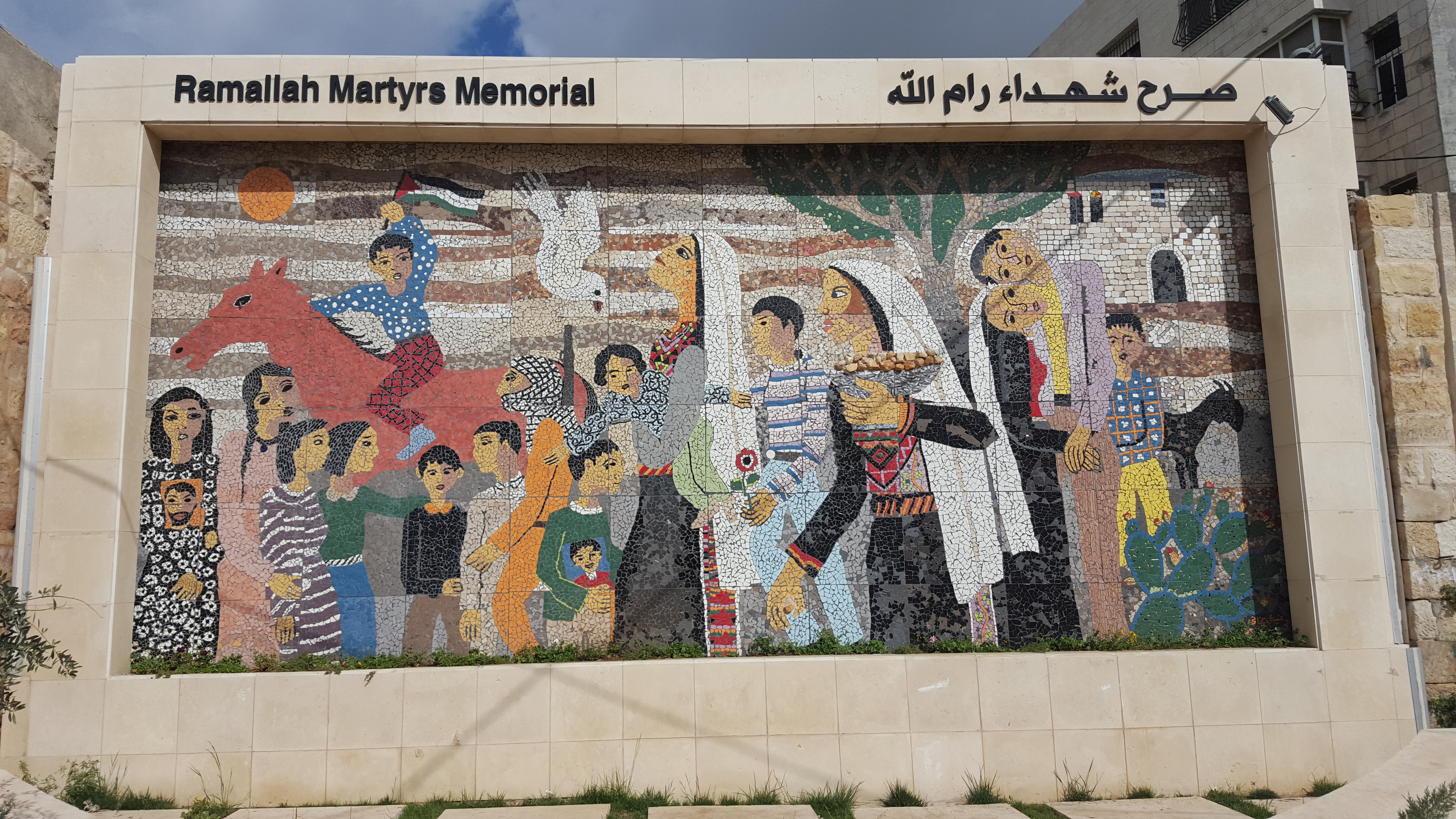
Ramallah Martyrs Memorial

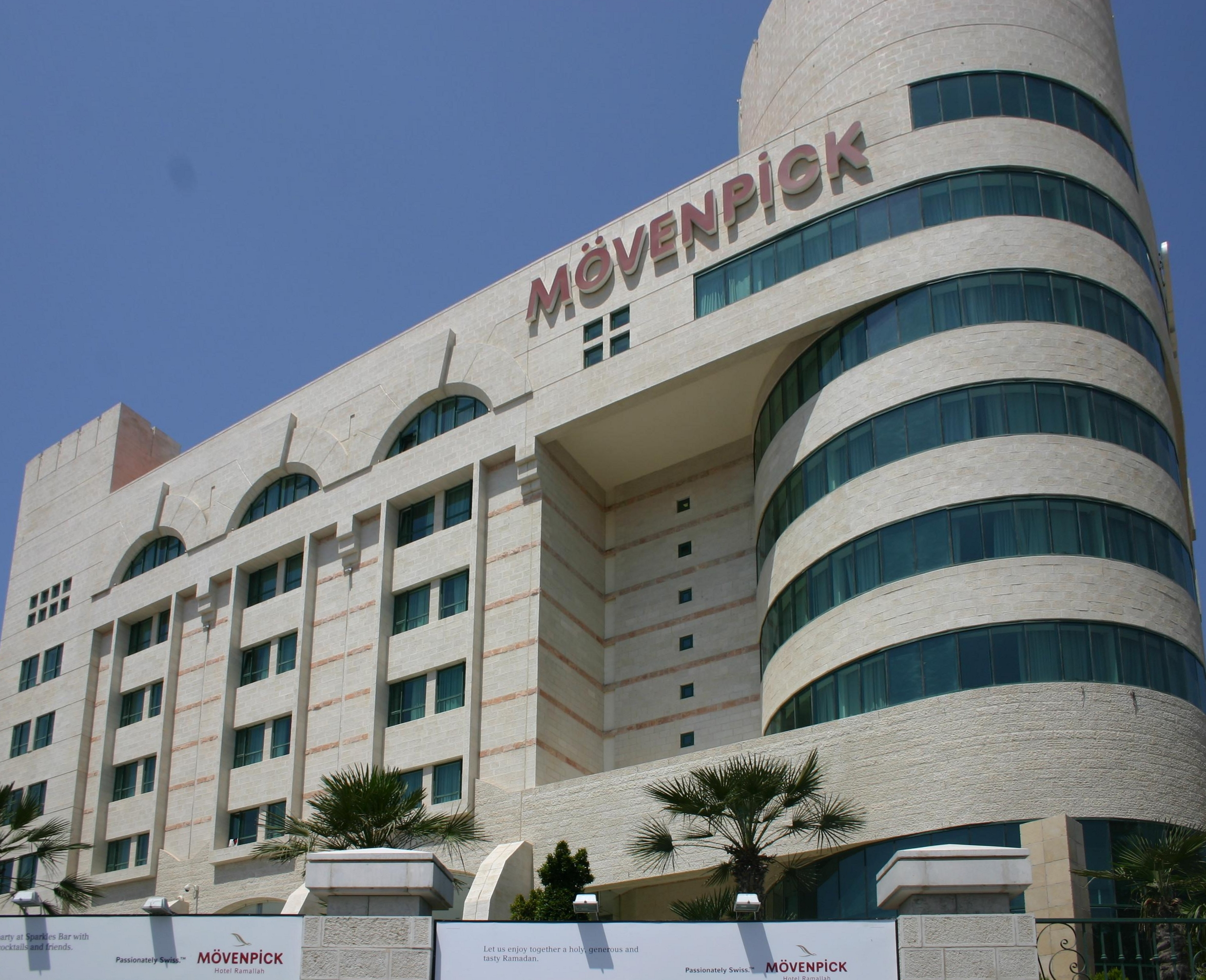
Moevenpick hotel

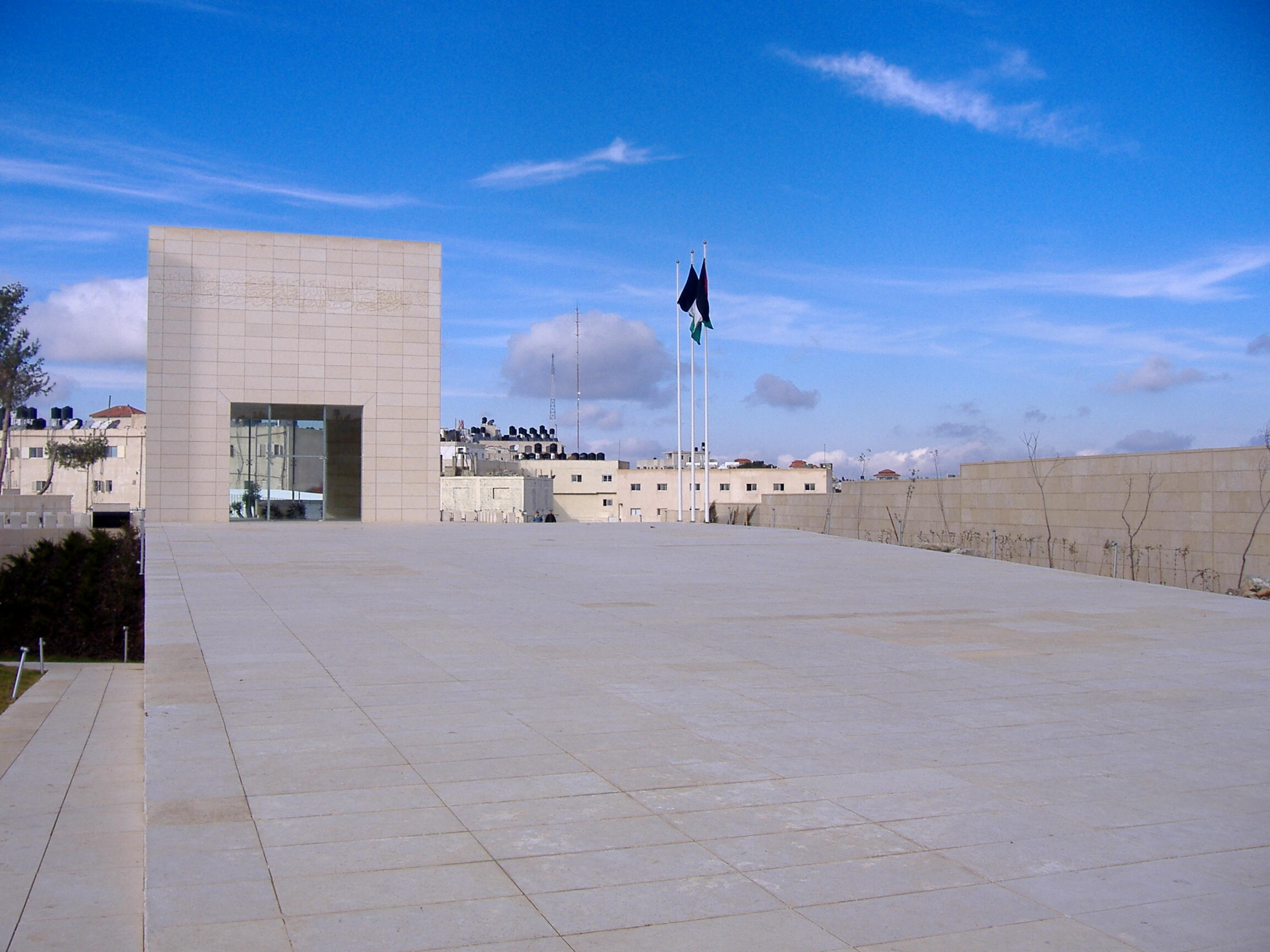
Arafat Mausoleum

=== Palestinian costume ===
Until the 1940s, traditional Palestinian costumes reflected a woman's economic and marital status and her town or district of origin, with knowledgeable observers discerning this information from the fabric, colours, cut, and embroidery motifs (or lack thereof) used in the apparel.

Villages in the Levant under Ottoman rule remained isolated due to the difficulty of travel in the 19th century. As a result, clothing and accessories became a statement of region. In Ramallah, the back panels of dresses often incorporated a palm tree motif embroidered in cross-stitch.

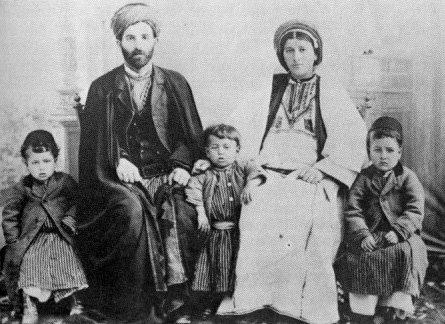
Christian family from Ramallah wearing typical Palestinian Ottoman-period clothing, c. 1905

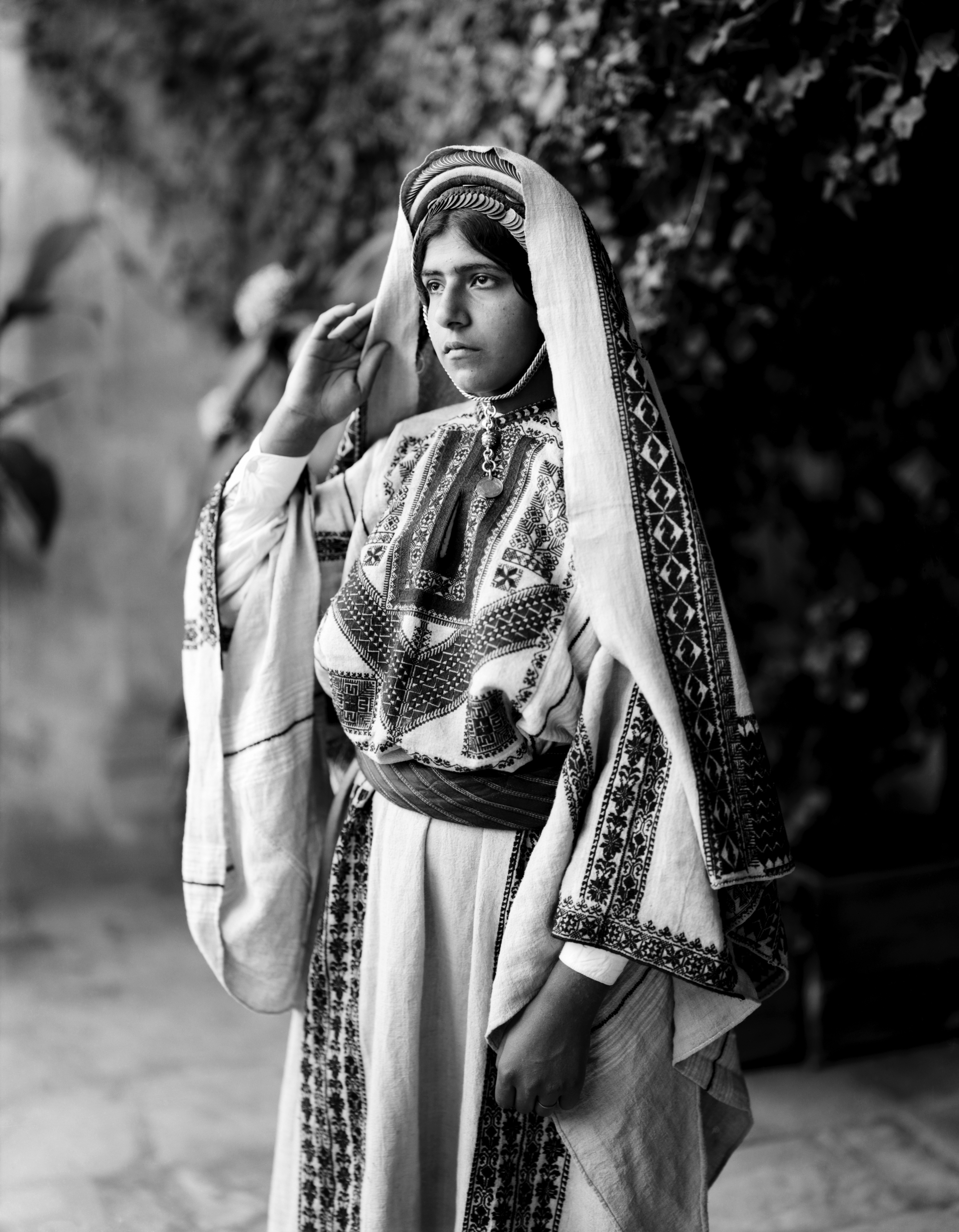
Young woman of Ramallah wearing dowry headdress, c. 1898–1914 (American Colony Collection)

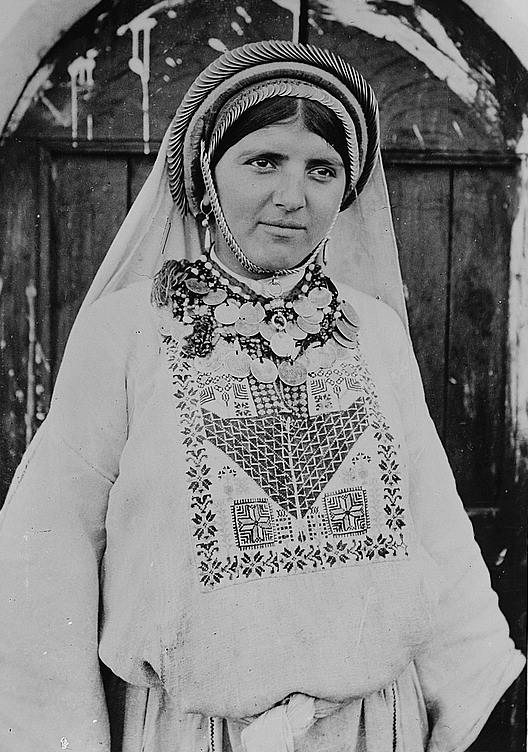
Ramallah woman, c. 1920 (The Matson Photo Service)

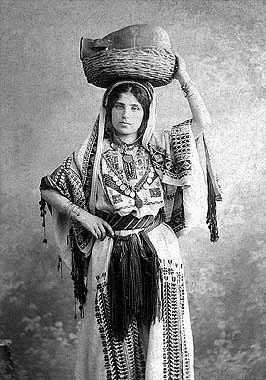
Traditional Women's Dress in Ramallah. Khalil Raad, c. 1920.

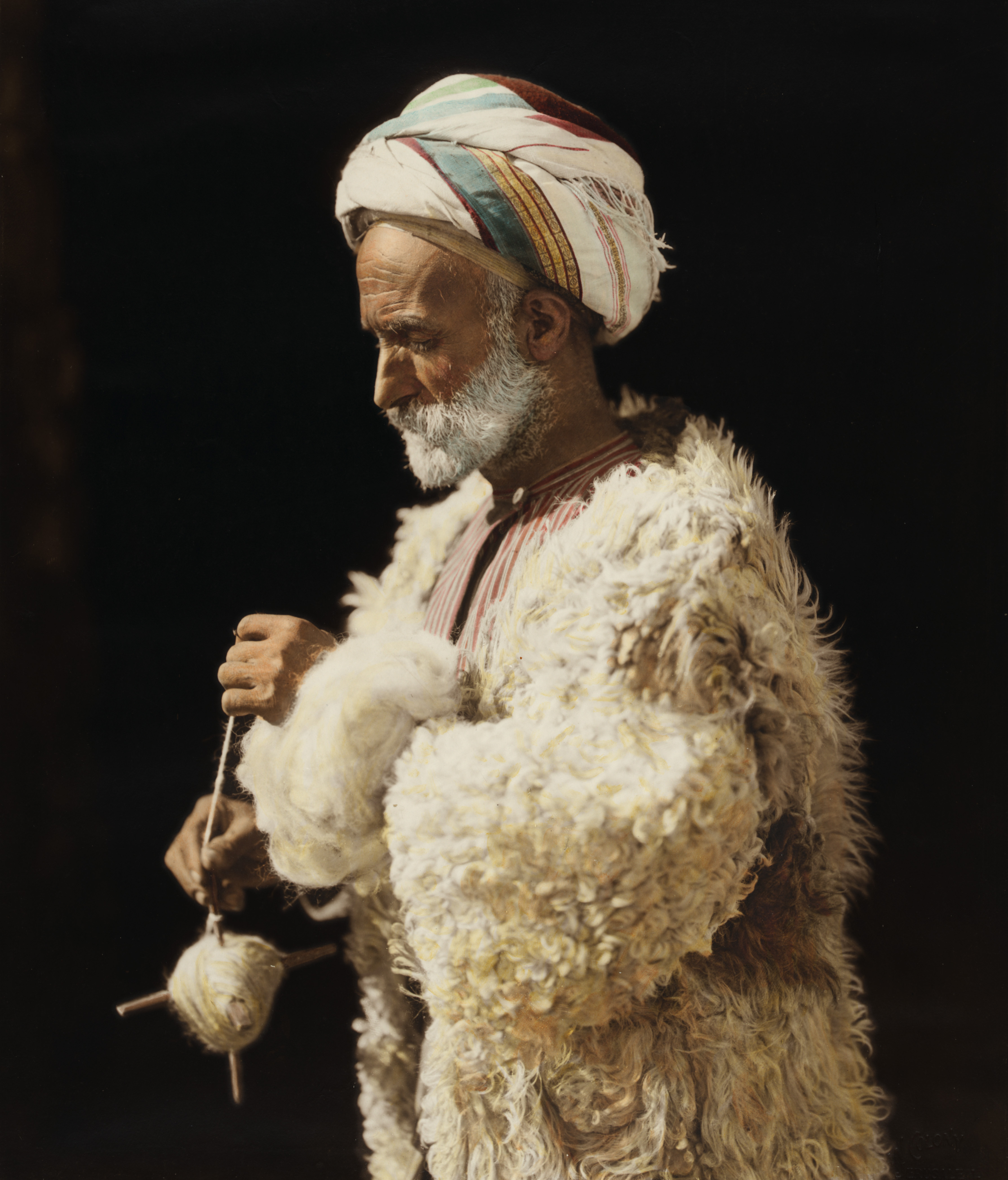
A man from Ramallah spinning wool. Hand tinted photograph from 1919, restored (American Colony Collection)

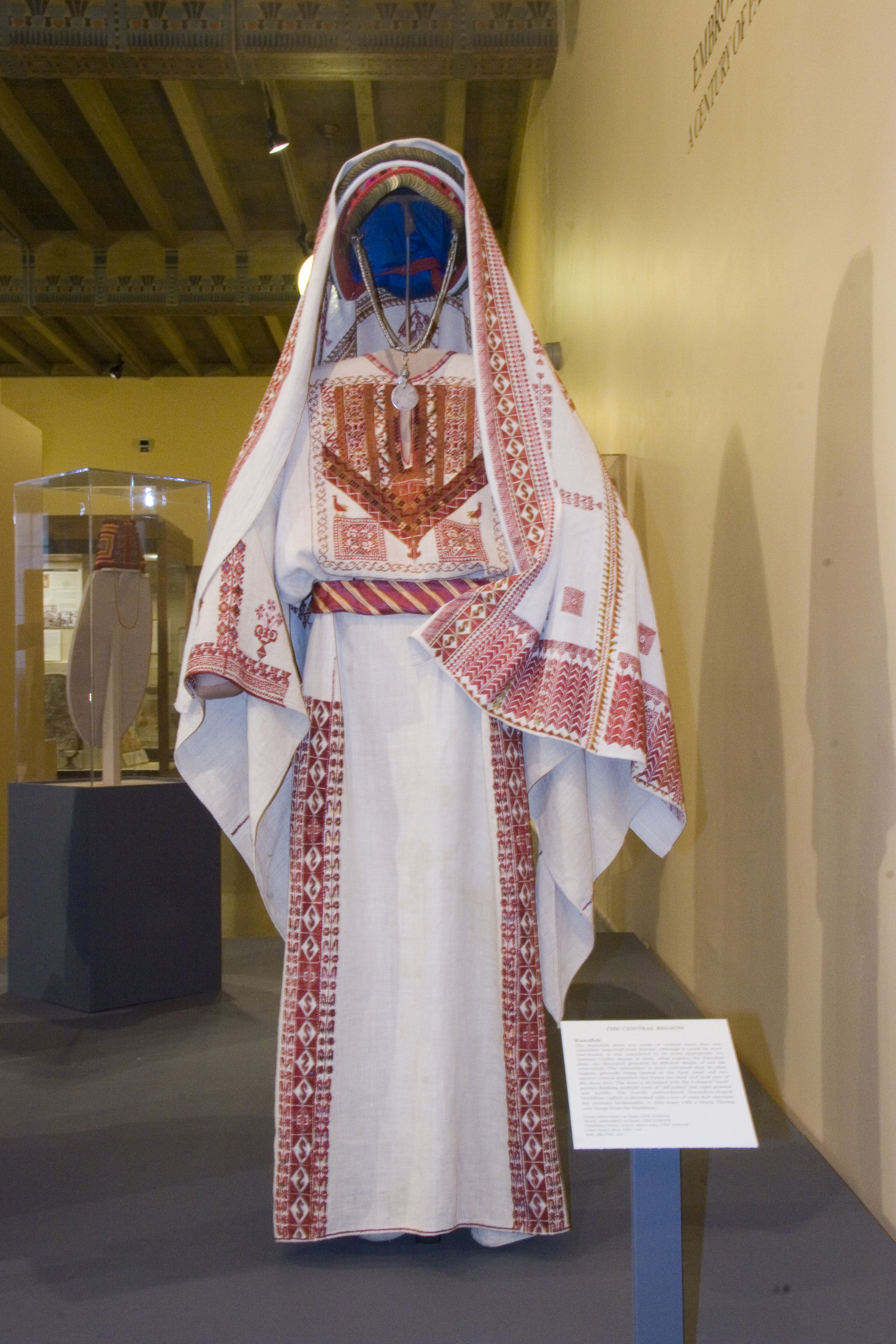
Ramallah dress at the Oriental Institute Museum

== International relations ==
Many foreign nations have located their diplomatic missions to the Palestinian Authority in Ramallah, including, as of 2010, Argentina, Australia, Austria, Korea, South Africa, Norway, Sri Lanka, Switzerland, China, Poland, Portugal, the Netherlands, Russia, Jordan, Brazil, Finland, Denmark, Ireland, Germany, India, Japan, the Czech Republic, Canada and Mexico.

=== Twin towns – sister cities ===
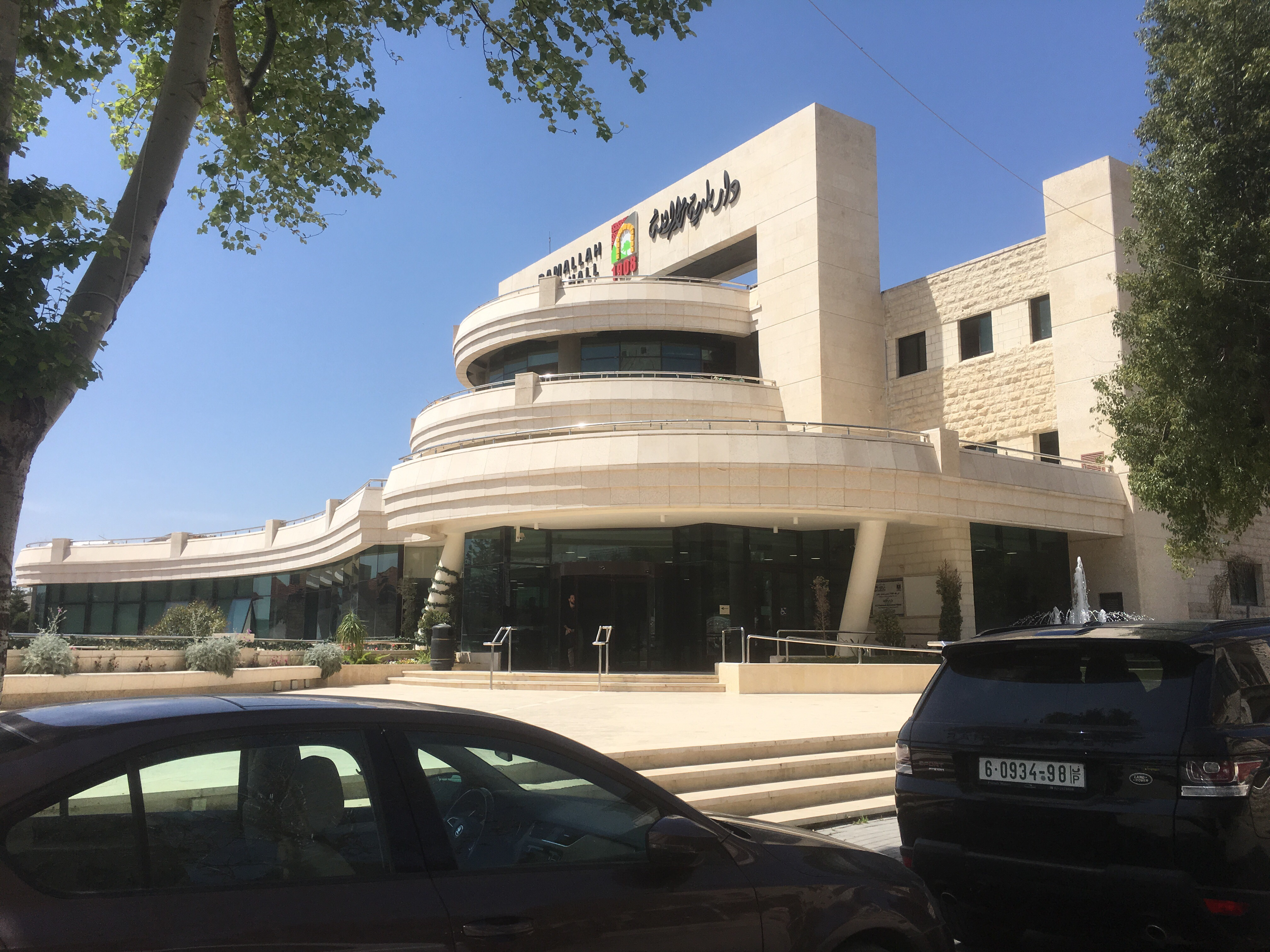
Ramallah City Hall

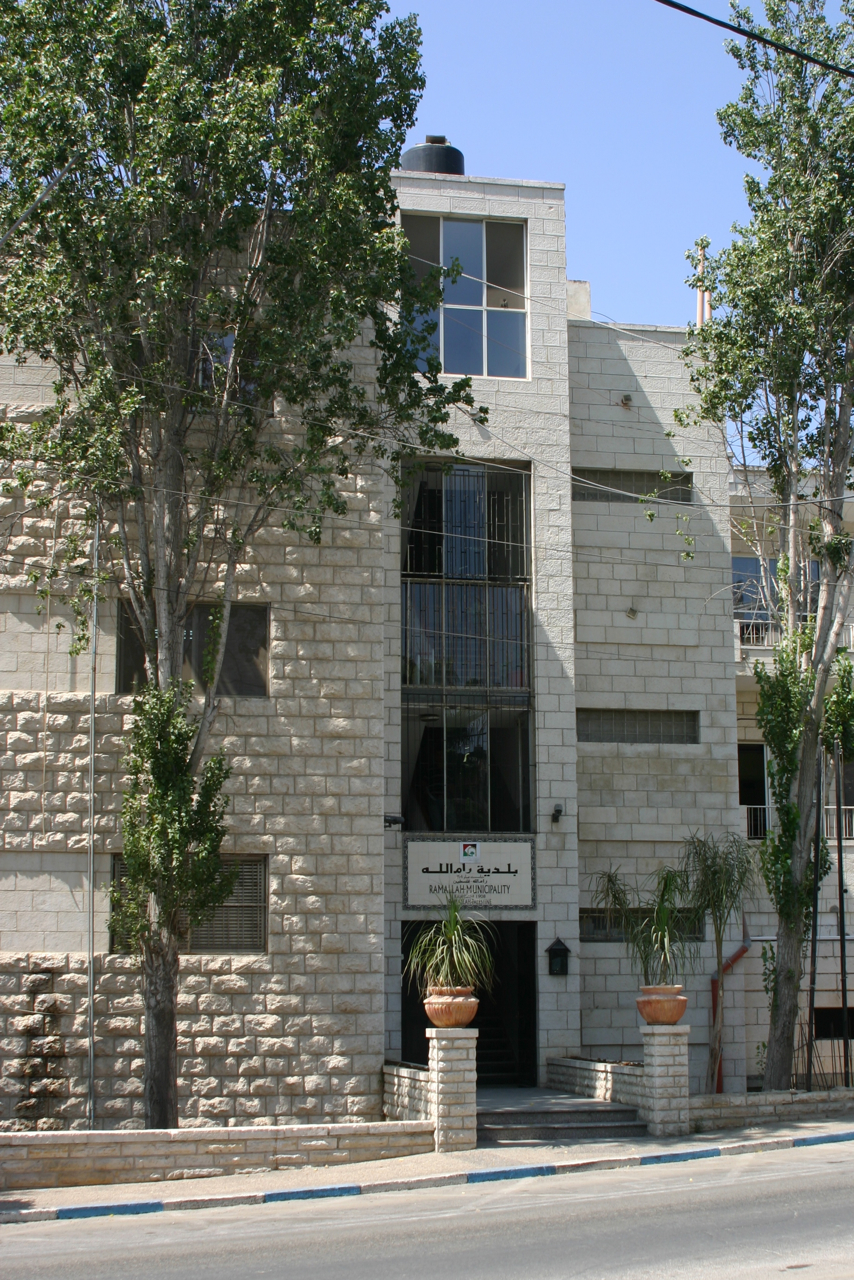
Ramallah Municipality building

Ramallah is twinned with:

- Bordeaux, France
- Hounslow, England, United Kingdom
- Johannesburg, South Africa
- Liège, Belgium
- Muscatine, Iowa, United States
- Oxford, England, United Kingdom
- Paterson, New Jersey, United States
- Sur, Turkey
- Trondheim, Norway
- (Republic of Ireland) Dublin, Ireland

== Notable people ==
- Paul Ajlouny (b. 1933), Palestinian-American publisher and businessman
- Hamze Awawde (b. 1990), Palestinian peace activist
- Mahmoud Eid (b. 1993), professional footballer
- Amber Fares, Lebanese Canadian filmmaker
- Yasmeen Mjalli (born 1996), American and Palestinian fashion designer, photographer and anti-street harassment activist.
- Jibril Rajoub (b. 1953), Palestinian political leader, former militant
- Mosab Hassan Yousef (b. 1978), Palestinian ex-militant and defector

== See also ==
- Palestinian Christians
- Economy of Palestine
- Al-Ram, a Palestinian town located southeast of Ramallah

== Bibliography ==
- Barron, J.B., ed. (1923). Palestine: Report and General Abstracts of the Census of 1922. Government of Palestine.
- Ben-Arieh, Yehoshua (1985). "The Sanjak of Jerusalem in the 1870s" (PDF). Cathedra (in Hebrew). 36: 73–122. Archived (PDF) from the original on July 22, 2020.
- Conder, C.R.; Kitchener, H.H. (1883). The Survey of Western Palestine: Memoirs of the Topography, Orography, Hydrography, and Archaeology. Vol. 3. London: Committee of the Palestine Exploration Fund.
- Finkelstein, I.; Lederman, Zvi, eds. (1997). Highlands of many cultures. Tel Aviv: Institute of Archaeology of Tel Aviv University Publications Section. ISBN 965-440-007-3. Archived from the original on August 10, 2020.
- Government of Jordan, Department of Statistics (1964). First Census of Population and Housing. Volume I: Final Tables; General Characteristics of the Population (PDF). Archived (PDF) from the original on April 3, 2015.
- Government of Palestine, Department of Statistics (1945). Village Statistics, April, 1945. Archived from the original on April 2, 2019.
- Grant, E. (1926). "Ramallah. Signs of the early occupation of this and other sites". Quarterly Statement – Palestine Exploration Fund. 58 (4): 186–195. doi:10.1179/peq.1926.58.4.186. ISSN 0031-0328.
- Guérin, V. (1875). Description Géographique Historique et Archéologique de la Palestine (in French). Vol. 2: Samarie, pt. 2. Paris: L'Imprimerie Nationale. (pp. 40- 41)
- Hadawi, S. (1970). Village Statistics of 1945: A Classification of Land and Area ownership in Palestine. Palestine Liberation Organization Research Center. Archived from the original on December 8, 2018.
- Hammoudeh, Sameeh (2014). "New Light on Ramallah's Origins in the Ottoman Period". Jerusalem Quarterly (59): 37–53. doi:10.70190/jq.I59.p37.
- Hartmann, M. (1883). "Die Ortschaftenliste des Liwa Jerusalem in dem türkischen Staatskalender für Syrien auf das Jahr 1288 der Flucht (1871)". Zeitschrift des Deutschen Palästina-Vereins. 6: 102–149.
- Hütteroth, W.-D.; Abdulfattah, K. (1977). Historical Geography of Palestine, Transjordan and Southern Syria in the Late 16th Century. Erlanger Geographische Arbeiten, Sonderband 5. Erlangen, Germany: Vorstand der Fränkischen Geographischen Gesellschaft. ISBN 3-920405-41-2. Archived from the original on October 14, 2019.
- Mills, E., ed. (1932). Census of Palestine 1931. Population of Villages, Towns and Administrative Areas. Jerusalem: Government of Palestine.
- Palmer, E.H. (1881). The Survey of Western Palestine: Arabic and English Name Lists Collected During the Survey by Lieutenants Conder and Kitchener, R. E. Transliterated and Explained by E.H. Palmer. Committee of the Palestine Exploration Fund.
- Pringle, D. (1997). Secular buildings in the Crusader Kingdom of Jerusalem: an archaeological Gazetteer. Cambridge University Press. ISBN 0521-46010-7.
- Rapoport, Yossef (2025). Becoming Arab: The Formation of Arab Identity in the Medieval Middle East. Princeton: Princeton University Press. ISBN 9780691210636.
- Rey, E.G. (1883). Les colonies franques de Syrie aux XIIme et XIIIme siècles (in French). Paris: A. Picard.
- Robinson, E.; Smith, E. (1841). Biblical Researches in Palestine, Mount Sinai and Arabia Petraea: A Journal of Travels in the year 1838. Vol. 2. Boston: Crocker & Brewster.
- Shaheen, Azeez (1982): Ramallah: Its history and genealogies. Birzeit University Press
- Schick, C. (1896). "Zur Einwohnerzahl des Bezirks Jerusalem". Zeitschrift des Deutschen Palästina-Vereins. 19: 120–127.
- Socin, A. (1879). "Alphabetisches Verzeichniss von Ortschaften des Paschalik Jerusalem". Zeitschrift des Deutschen Palästina-Vereins. 2: 135–163.
