= Chișinău =

Capital and largest city of Moldova

- Capital city and municipality
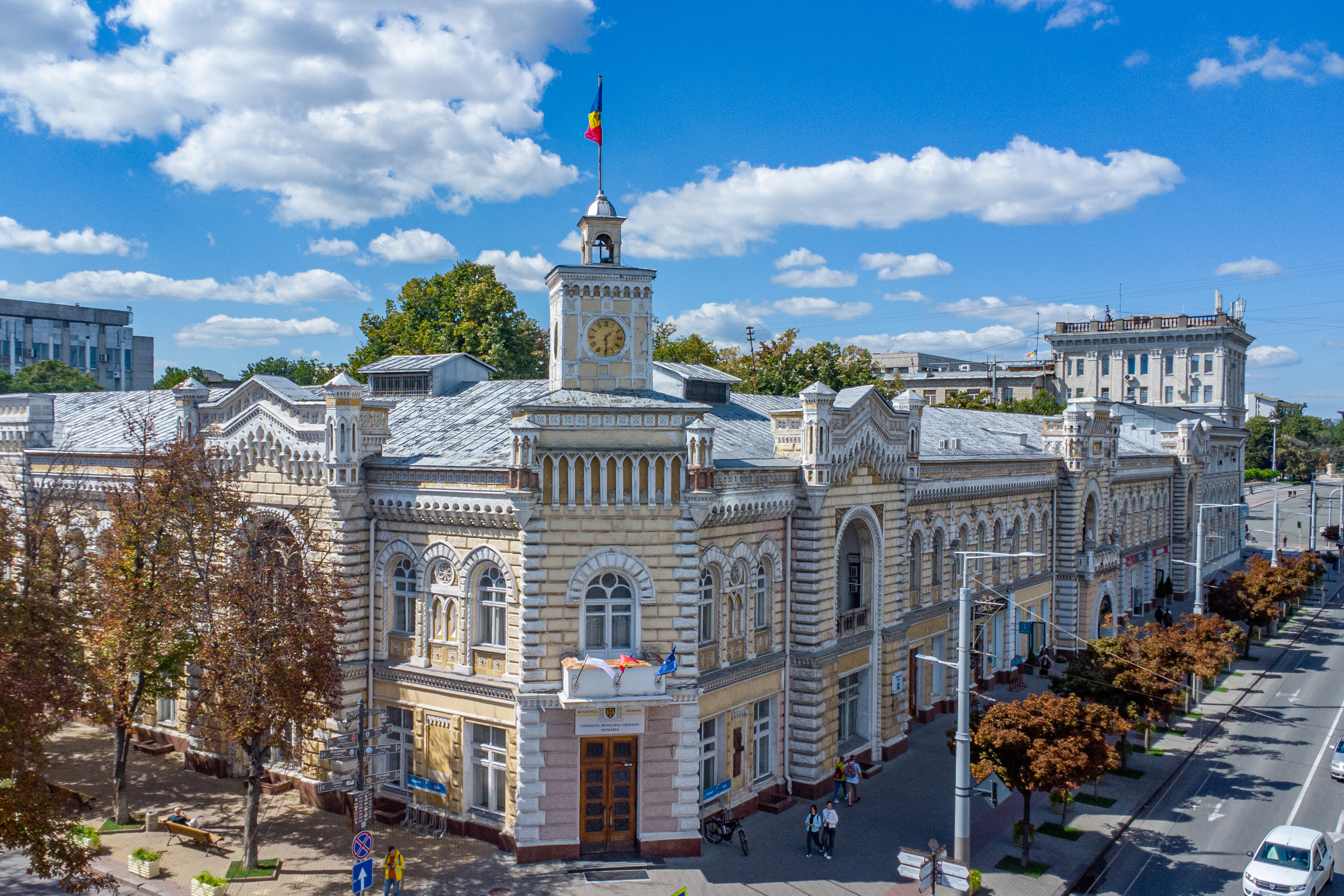
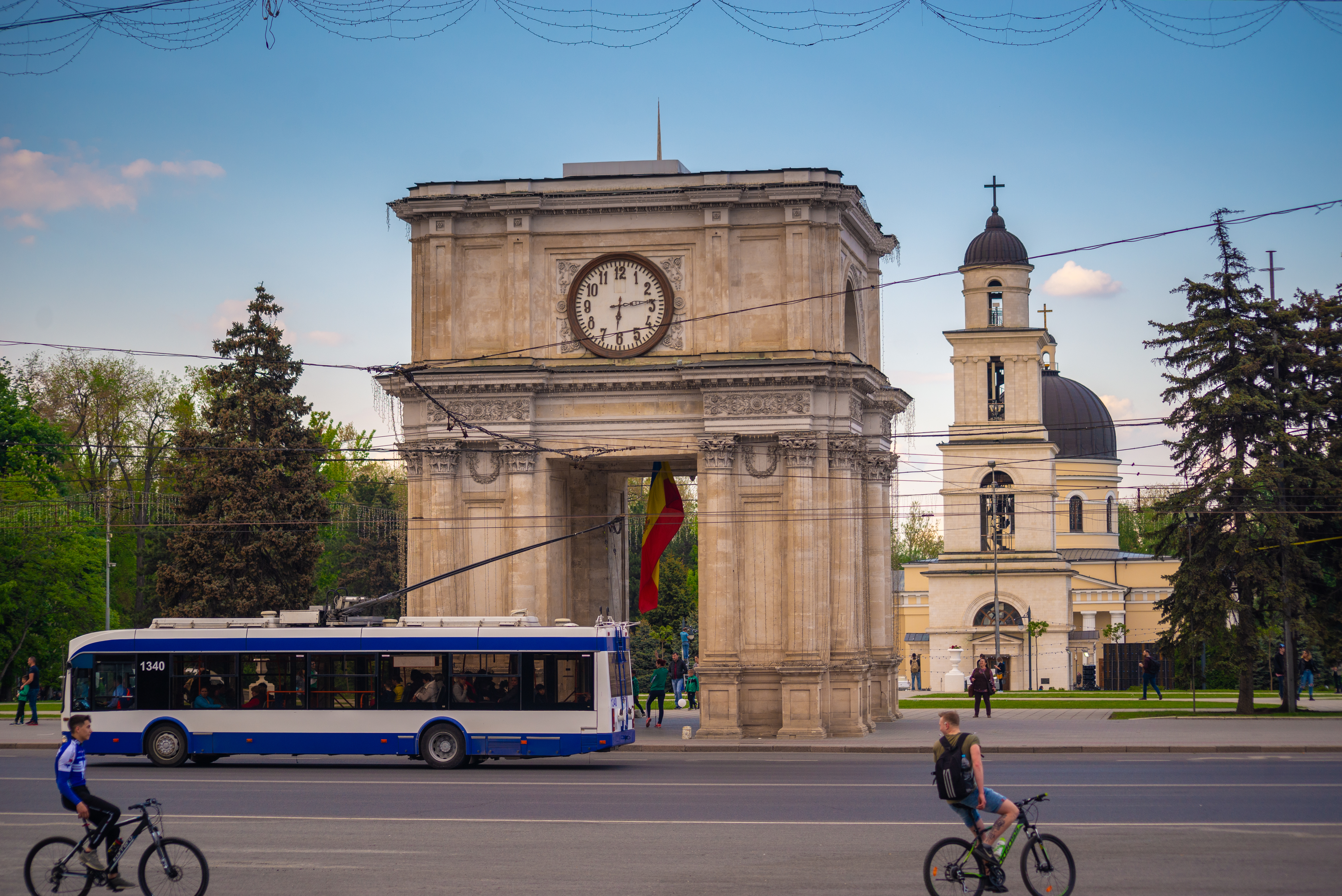
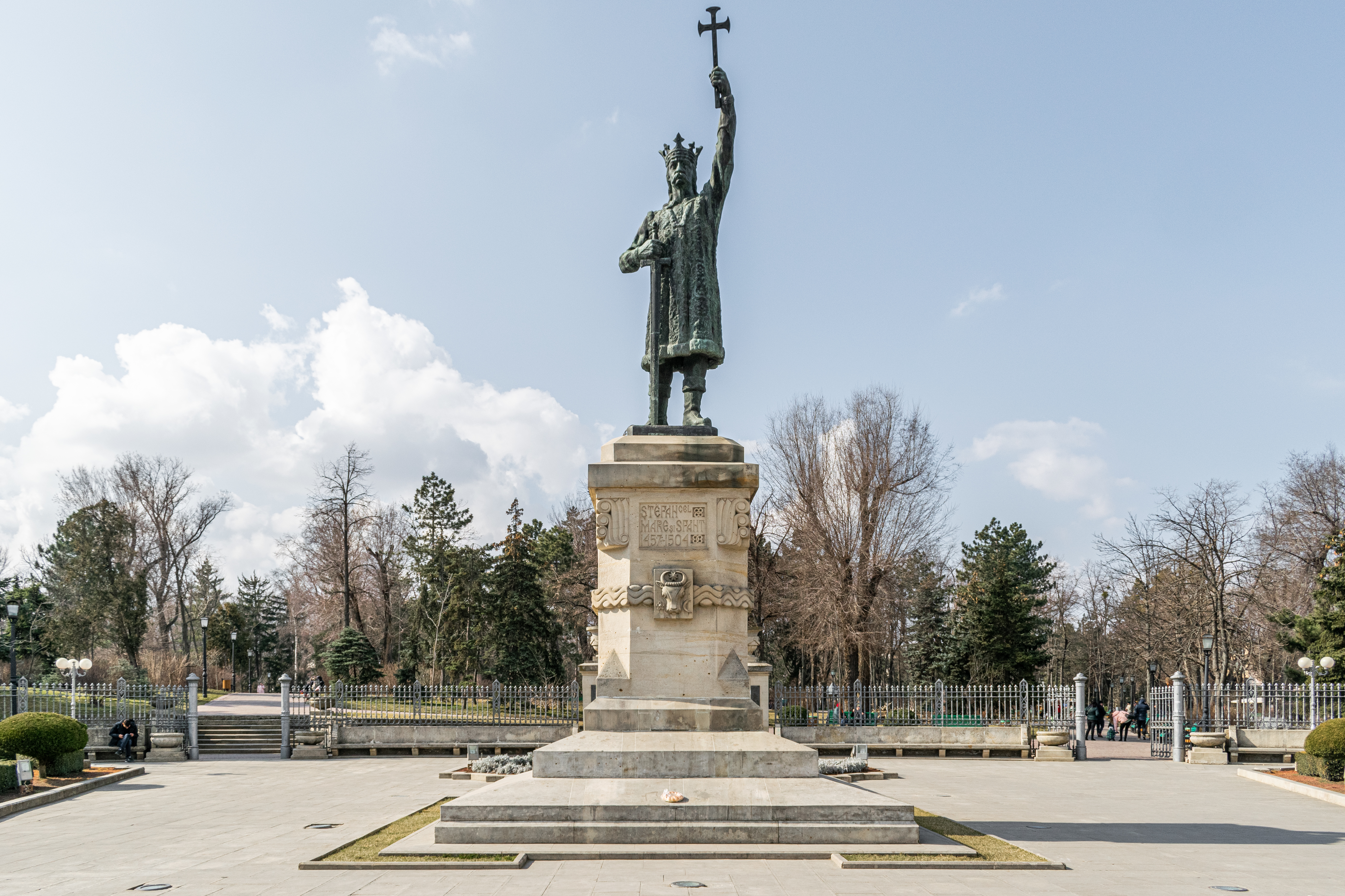
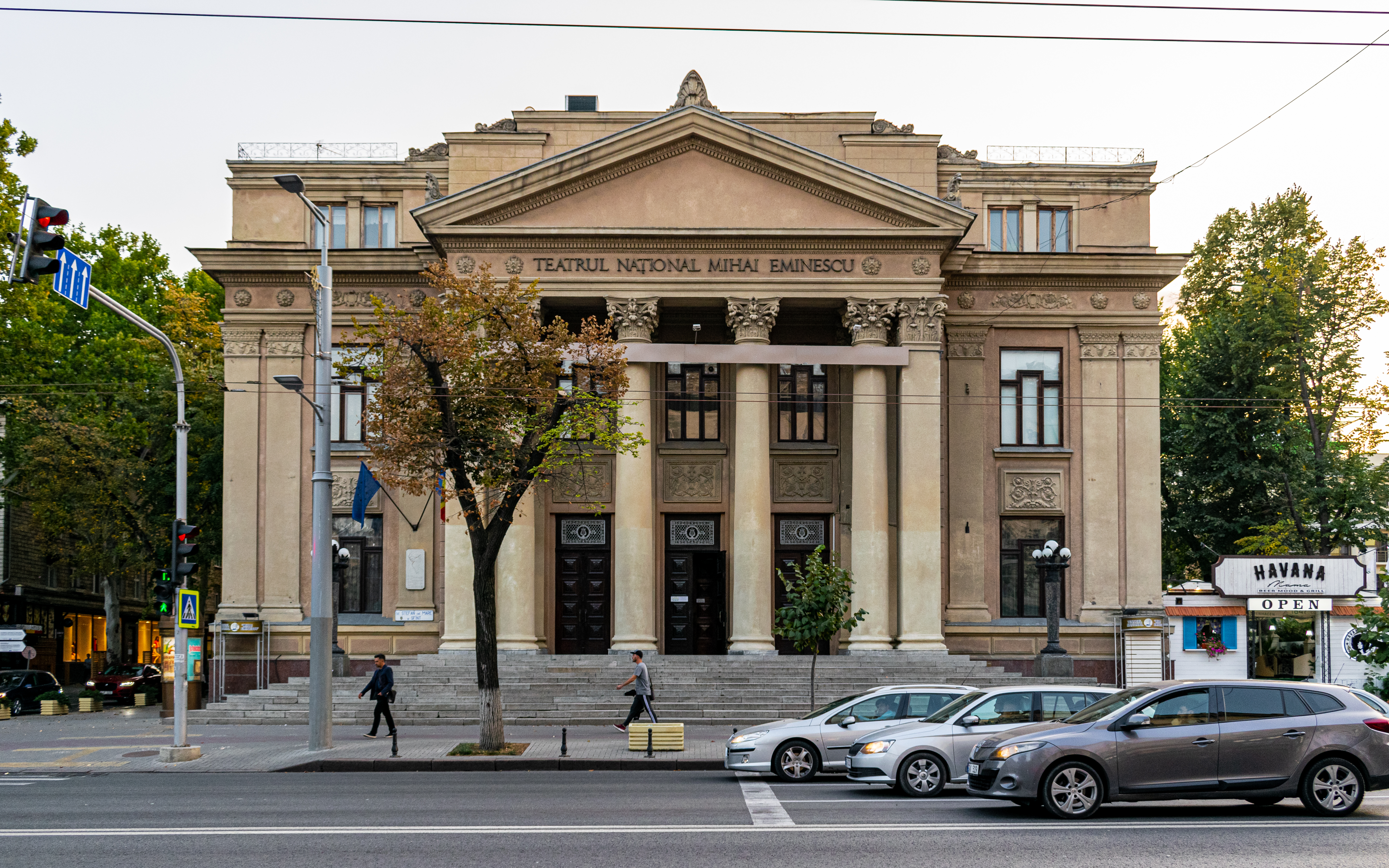
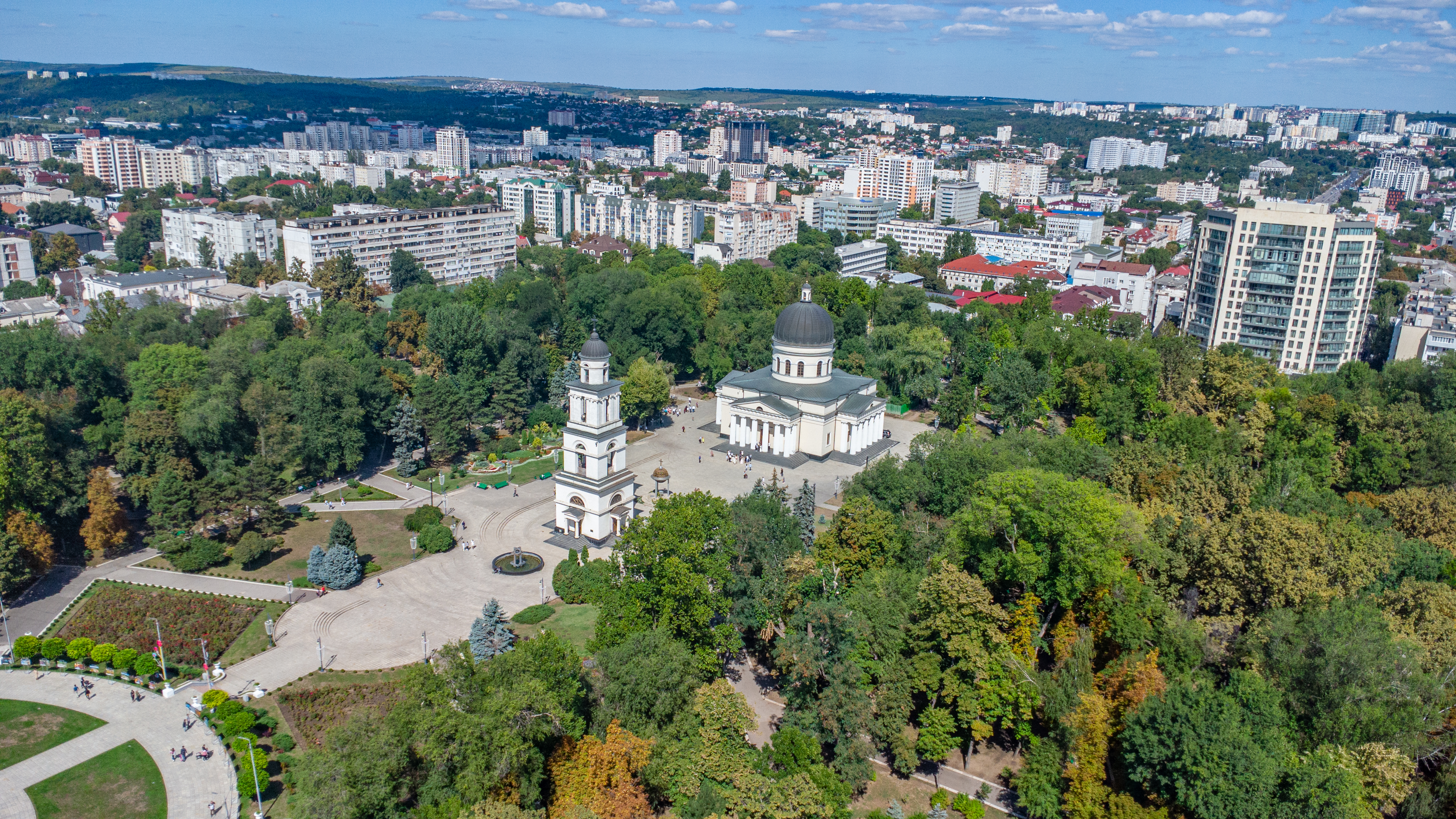
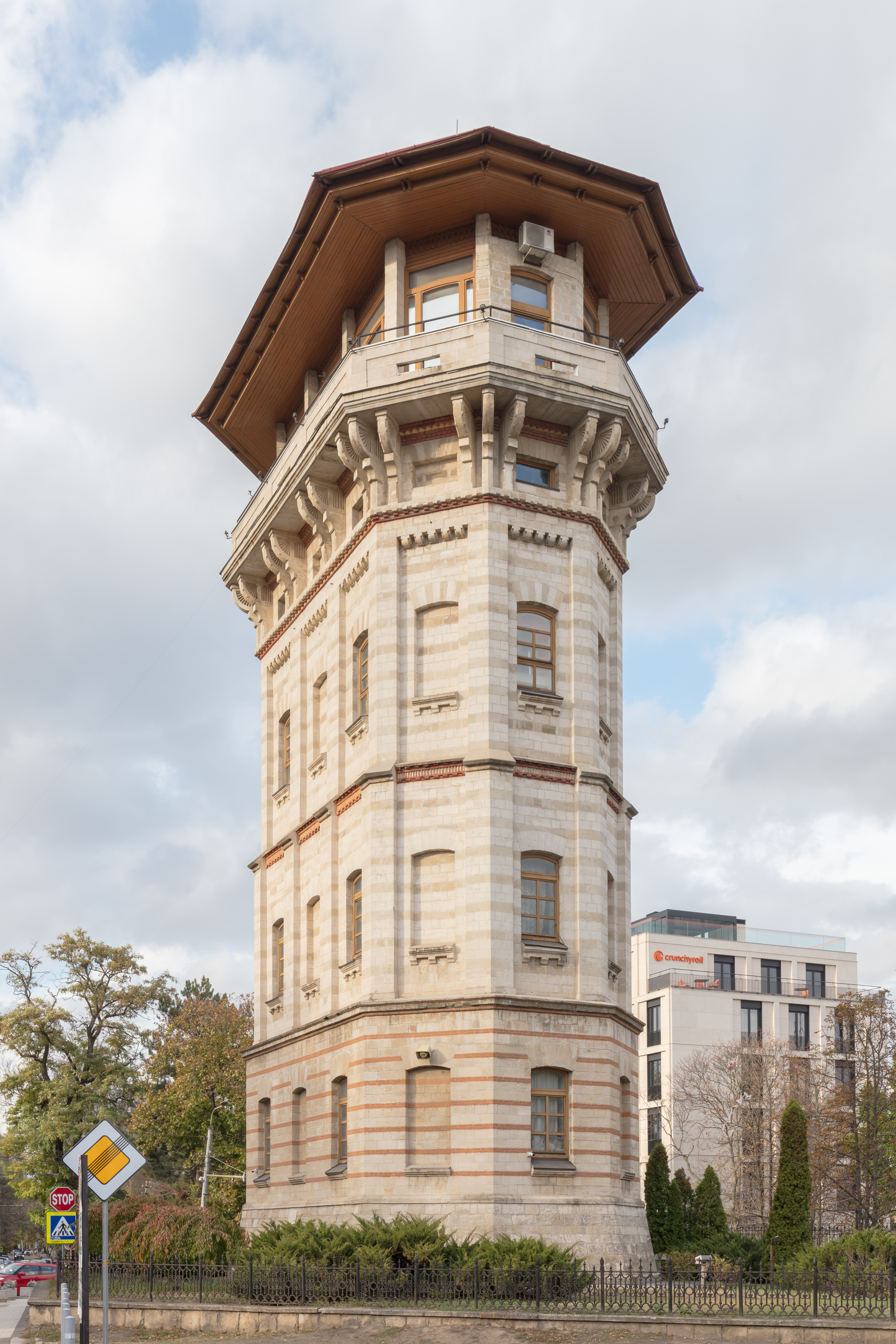
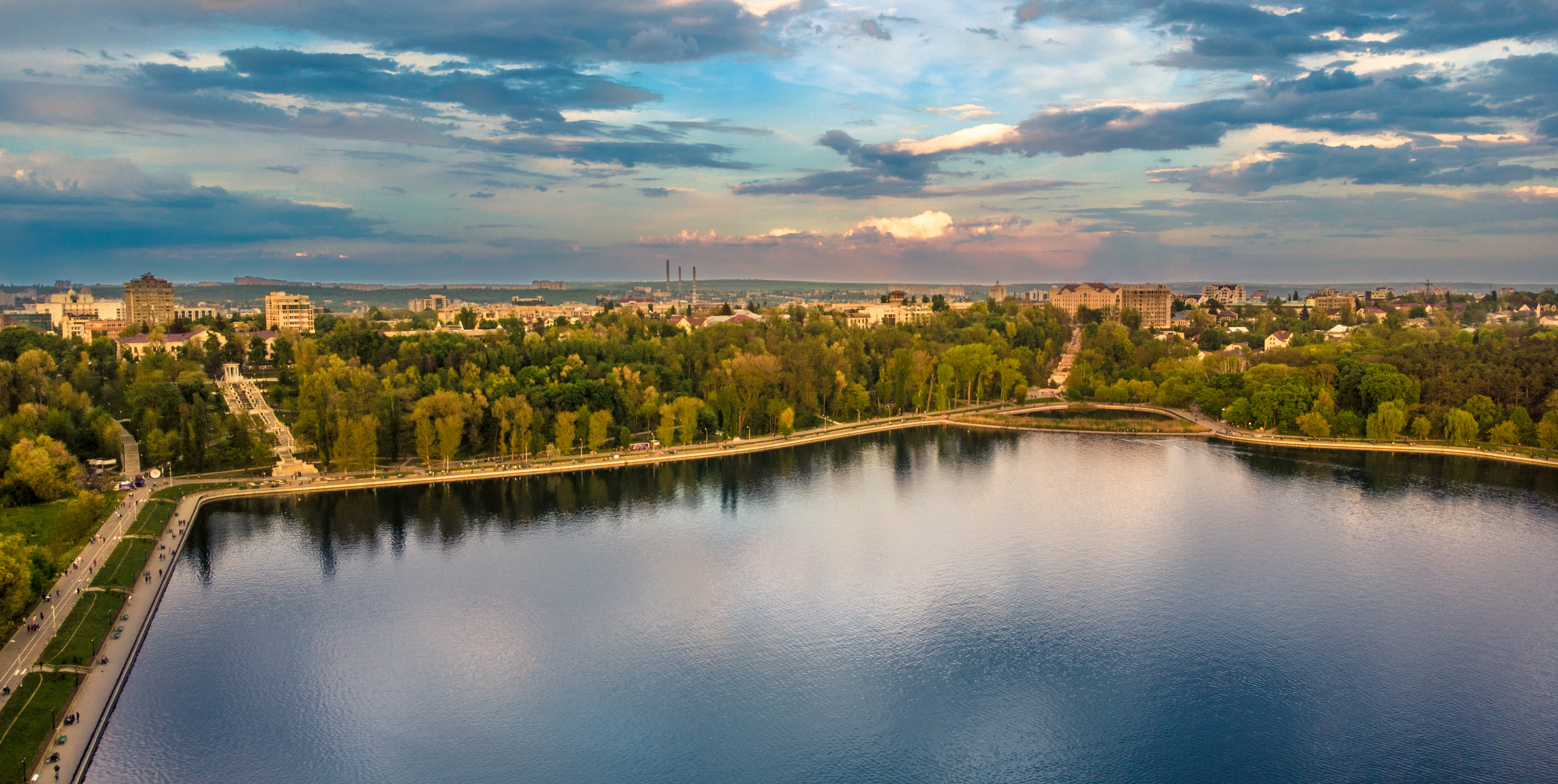
- Chișinău City Hall Triumphal Arch and Nativity Cathedral Stephen the Great Monument Mihai Eminescu National Theatre Aerial view Water tower Valea Morilor Park

- Flag Coat of arms
- Nickname: Orașul din piatră albă (lit. 'The city of white stone')
- Interactive map of Chișinău
- Location within Moldova Location within Europe
- Coordinates: 47°01′22″N 28°50′07″E
- Country: Moldova
- First written mention: 14 October 1436

Government
  - Type: Mayor–council government
  - Mayor: Ion Ceban (MAN)

Area
  - Capital city and municipality: 123 km^{2} (47 sq mi)
  - Metro: 571.6 km^{2} (220.7 sq mi)
- Elevation: 85 m (279 ft)

Population (2024 census)
  - Capital city and municipality: 720,128
  - Rank: 1st
  - Density: 5,850/km^{2} (15,200/sq mi)
  - Metro: 988,342 (Note: Combined population of Strășeni, Ialoveni, Anenii Noi, Dubăsari, Criuleni and Chișinău Municipalities)
- Demonym: chișinăuieni (Romanian)

GDP (Nominal, 2023)
  - Capital city and municipality: US$10.3 billion (1st)
  - Per capita: US$14,300
- Time zone: UTC+02:00 (EET)
  - Summer (DST): UTC+03:00 (EEST)
- Postal code: MD-20xx
- Area code: +373-22
- ISO 3166 code: MD-CU
- HDI (2023): 0.858; Very high · 1st
- Website: chisinau.md
- ^{a} As the population of the Municipality of Chișinău (which comprises the city of Chișinău and 34 other suburban localities)

Chișinău (/ˌkɪʃɪˈnaʊ/ KIH-shih-NOW; Romanian: [kiʃiˈnəw]; formerly known by its Russian form Kishinev) (Note: /ˈkɪʃənɛf, -nɛv/ KISH-ə-nef, -nev; Russian: Кишинёв, romanized: Kishinyov [kʲɪʂɨˈnʲɵf]) is the capital and largest city of Moldova by area and population. The city is Moldova's main industrial and commercial centre. It is situated in the middle of the country, on the river Bîc, a tributary of the Dniester. According to the results of the 2024 Moldovan census, the population of the city proper stood at over 567,000 inhabitants, while the population of the Municipality of Chișinău (which includes the city itself and other nearby communities) numbered over 720,000 people. Chișinău is the most economically prosperous locality in Moldova and the country's largest transport hub. Nearly a third of Moldova's population resides in the metropolitan area.

Moldova has a history of winemaking dating back to at least 3,000 BC. As the capital city, Chișinău hosts the yearly national wine festival every October. Though the city's buildings were significantly damaged during the Second World War and earthquakes, a rich architectural heritage remains. In addition, it has numerous buildings designed in the postwar Socialist realism and Brutalist architecture styles.

The city's central railway station boasts a Russian-Imperial architectural style and maintains direct railway links to Romania. The Swiss-Italian-Russian architect Alexander Bernardazzi designed many of the city's buildings, including the Chișinău City Hall, Church of Saint Theodore, and the Church of Saint Panteleimon. The city hosts the National Museum of Fine Arts, Moldova State University, Brancusi Gallery, and National Museum of History of Moldova, with more than 236,000 exhibits.

There are bustling markets in the north of the city, including the house where Alexander Pushkin once resided while in exile from Alexander I of Russia. It has now been adapted as a museum.

== Etymology ==
The origin of the city's name is unclear. A theory suggests that the name may be derived from the archaic Romanian word chișla (meaning "spring", "source of water") and nouă ("new"), because it was built around a small spring, at the corner of Pușkin and Albișoara streets.

The other version, formulated by (or attributed to) Ștefan Ciobanu (occasionally to Iorgu Iordan), a Romanian historian and academician, holds that the name was formed the same way as the name of Chișineu (alternatively spelled as Chișinău) in Western Romania, near the border with Hungary. Its Hungarian name is Kisjenő, from which the Romanian name originates. Kisjenő comes from kis "small" and the Jenő, one of the seven Hungarian tribes that entered the Carpathian Basin in 896.

A third theory by Kiss Lajos, linguist and Slavist, holds (as a possible origin) that the name came from the Cuman kešene ("grave", kurgan) and the Karachayian for "cemetery", and these came from the Persian word kāšāne ("house").

Chișinău is known in Russian as Kishinyov (Кишинёв, pronounced [kʲɪʂɨˈnʲɵf]), while Moldova's Russian-language media call it Kishineu (Кишинэу, pronounced [kʲɪʂɨˈnɛʊ]). It is written Kişinöv in the Latin Gagauz alphabet. It was also written as Chișineu in pre–20th-century Romanian and as Кишинэу in the Moldovan Cyrillic alphabet. Historically, the English-language name for the city, Kishinev, was based on the modified Russian one because it entered the English language via Russian at the time Chișinău was part of the Russian Empire (e.g., Kishinev pogrom). Therefore, it remains a common English name in some historical contexts. Otherwise, the Romanian-based Chișinău has been steadily gaining wider currency, especially in written language. The city is also historically referred to as Lithuanian: Kišiniovas; Hungarian: Kisjenő; German: Kischinau [ˌkɪʃiˈnaʊ]; Polish: Kiszyniów [kʲiˈʂɨɲuf]; Ukrainian: Кишинів, romanized: Kyshyniv, pronounced [kɪʃɪˈnʲiu̯]; Bulgarian: Кишинев, romanized: Kishinev; Yiddish: קעשענעװ, romanized: Keshenev; or Turkish: Kişinev.

== History ==
Historical affiliations

Principality of Moldavia 1436–1812
Russian Empire 1812–1917
(Russia) Russian Republic 1917
Moldavian Democratic Republic 1917–1918
Kingdom of Romania 1918–1940
Soviet Union 1940–1941
Kingdom of Romania 1941–1944
Soviet Union 1944–1991
Moldova 1991–present

=== Moldavian period ===
Founded in 1436 as a monastery village, it was part of the Principality of Moldavia (which, starting with the 16th century, became a vassal state of the Ottoman Empire, but still retaining its autonomy). At the beginning of the 19th century, Chișinău was a small town of 7,000 inhabitants.

=== Russian Imperial period ===
In 1812, in the aftermath of the Russo-Turkish War (1806–1812), the eastern half of Moldavia was ceded by the Ottomans to the Russian Empire. The newly acquired territories became known as Bessarabia.

Under the Russian government, Chișinău became the capital of the newly annexed oblast (later guberniya) of Bessarabia. By 1834, an imperial townscape with broad and long roads had emerged as a result of a generous development plan, which divided Chișinău roughly into two areas: the old part of the town, with its irregular building structures, and a newer city centre and station. Between 26 May 1830 and 13 October 1836, the architect Avraam Melnikov established the Catedrala Nașterea Domnului with a magnificent bell tower. In 1840, the building of the Triumphal Arch, planned by the architect Luca Zaushkevich, was completed. Following this, the construction of numerous buildings and landmarks began.

On 28 August 1871, Chișinău was linked by rail with Tiraspol, and in 1873 with Cornești. Chișinău-Ungheni-Iași railway was opened on 1 June 1875 in preparation for the Russo-Turkish War (1877–1878). The town played an important part in the war between Russia and the Ottoman Empire, as the main staging area of the Russian invasion. During the Belle Époque, the mayor of the city was Carol Schmidt, whose contribution to the modernisation of the city is still commemorated by Moldovans. Its population had grown to 92,000 by 1862, and to 125,787 by 1900.

==== Pogroms and pre-revolution ====
In the late 19th century, especially due to growing anti-Semitic sentiment in other parts of the Russian Empire and better economic conditions in Moldova, many Jews chose to settle in Chișinău. By the year 1897, 46% of the population of Chișinău was Jewish, over 50,000 people.

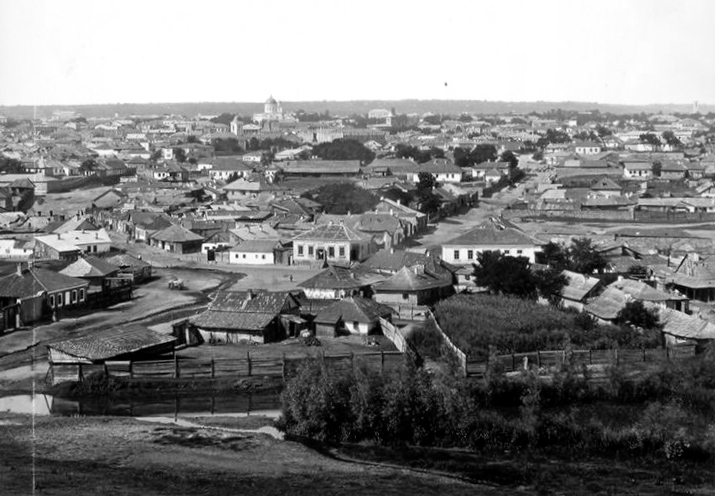
Chișinău, 1889

As part of the pogrom wave organized in the Russian Empire, a large anti-Semitic riot was organized in the town on 19–20 April 1903, which would later be known as the Kishinev pogrom. The rioting continued for three days, resulting in 47 Jews dead, 92 severely wounded, and 500 suffering minor injuries. In addition, several hundred houses and many businesses were plundered and destroyed. Some sources say 49 people were killed. The pogroms are largely believed to have been incited by anti-Jewish propaganda in the only official newspaper of the time, Bessarabetz (Бессарабецъ). Mayor Schmidt disapproved of the incident and resigned later in 1903. The reactions to this incident included a petition to Tsar Nicholas II of Russia on behalf of the American people by US President Theodore Roosevelt in July 1903.

On 22 August 1905, another violent event occurred: the police opened fire on an estimated 3,000 demonstrating agricultural workers. Only a few months later, on 19–20 October 1905, a further protest occurred, helping to force the hand of Nicholas II in bringing about the October Manifesto. However, these demonstrations suddenly turned into another anti-Jewish pogrom, resulting in 19 deaths.

=== Romanian period ===
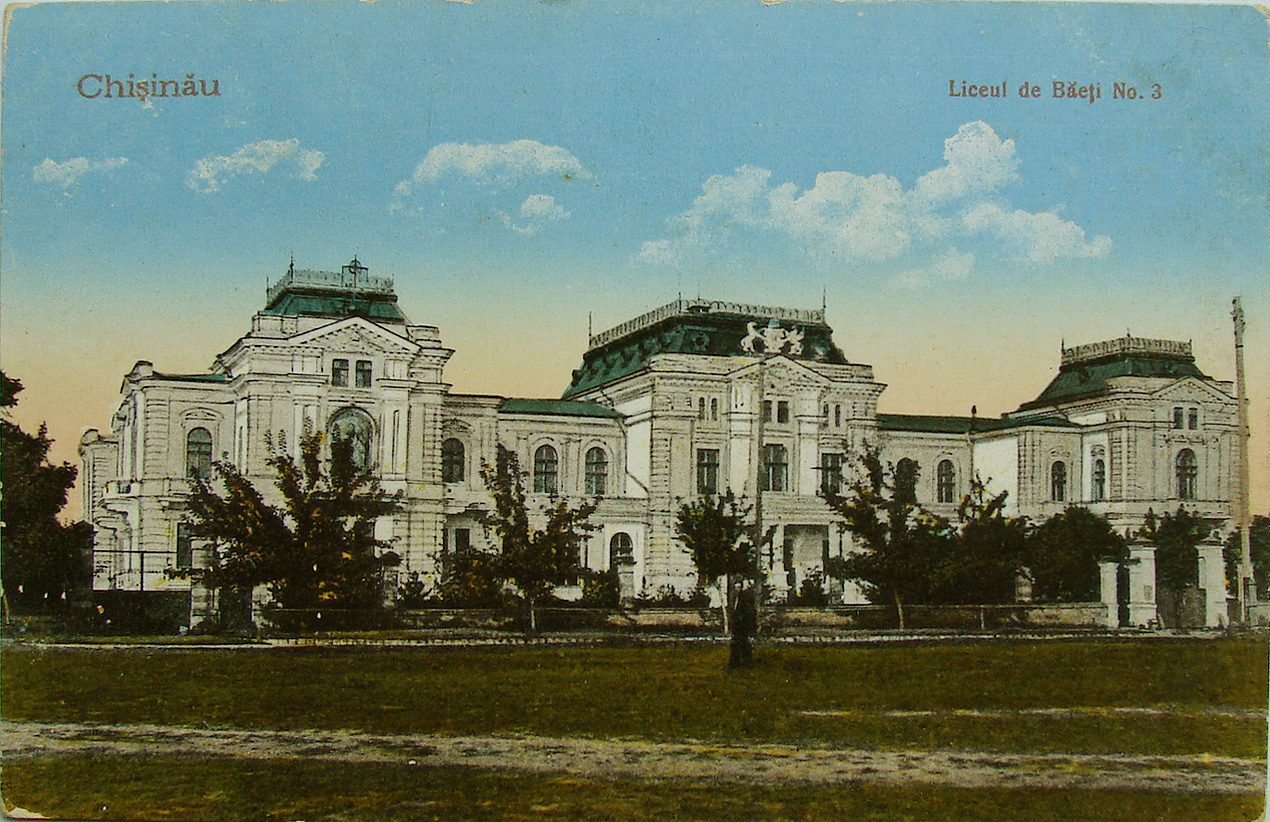
Sfatul Țării Palace in c. 1920

Following the Russian October Revolution, Bessarabia declared independence as the Moldavian Democratic Republic, before joining the Kingdom of Romania. As of 1919, Chișinău, with an estimated population of 133,000, became the second largest city in Romania.

Between 1918 and 1940, the city center undertook large renovation work. Romania granted important subsidies to its provinces and initiated large-scale investment programs in the infrastructure of the main cities in Bessarabia, expanded the railroad infrastructure, and launched an extensive program to eradicate illiteracy.

In 1927, the Stephen the Great Monument, by the sculptor Alexandru Plămădeală, was erected. In 1933, the first higher education institution in Bessarabia was established by transferring the Agricultural Sciences Section of the University of Iași to Chișinău, as the Faculty of Agricultural Sciences.

=== World War II ===
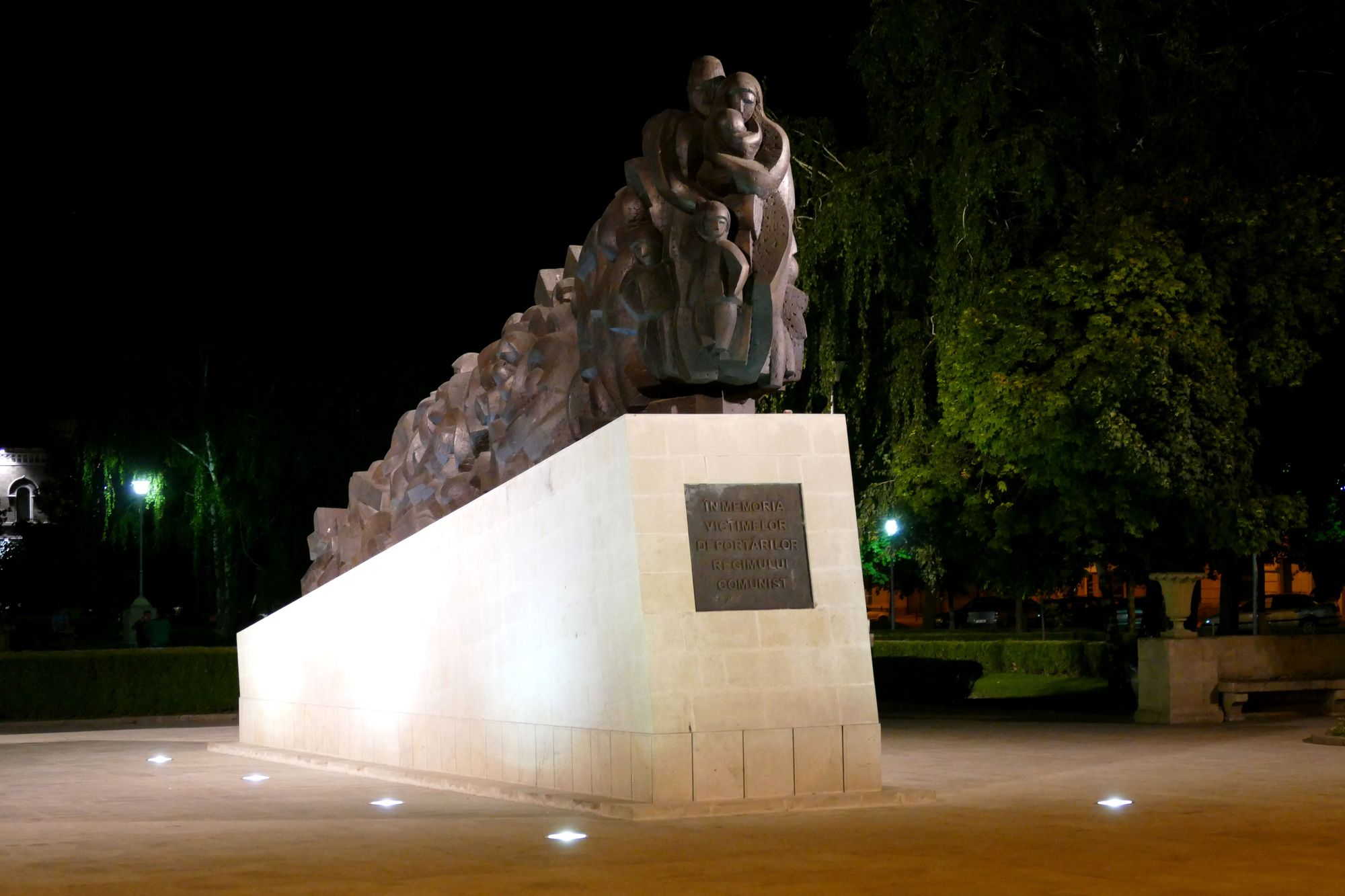
Train of Pain – the monument to the victims of communist mass deportations in Moldova

On 28 June 1940, as a direct result of the Molotov–Ribbentrop Pact, Bessarabia was annexed by the Soviet Union from Romania, and Chișinău became the capital of the newly created Moldavian Soviet Socialist Republic.

Following the Soviet occupation, mass deportations, linked with atrocities, were executed by the NKVD between June 1940 and June 1941. More than 400 people were summarily executed in Chișinău in July 1940 and buried in the grounds of the Metropolitan Palace, the Chișinău Theological Institute, and the backyard of the Italian Consulate, where the NKVD had established its headquarters. As part of the policy of political repression of the potential opposition to the Communist power, tens of thousands of members of native families were deported from Bessarabia to other regions of the USSR.

A devastating earthquake occurred on 10 November 1940, measuring 7.4 (or 7.7, according to other sources) on the Richter scale. The epicenter of the quake was in the Vrancea Mountains, and it led to substantial destruction: 78 deaths and 2,795 damaged buildings (of which 172 were destroyed).

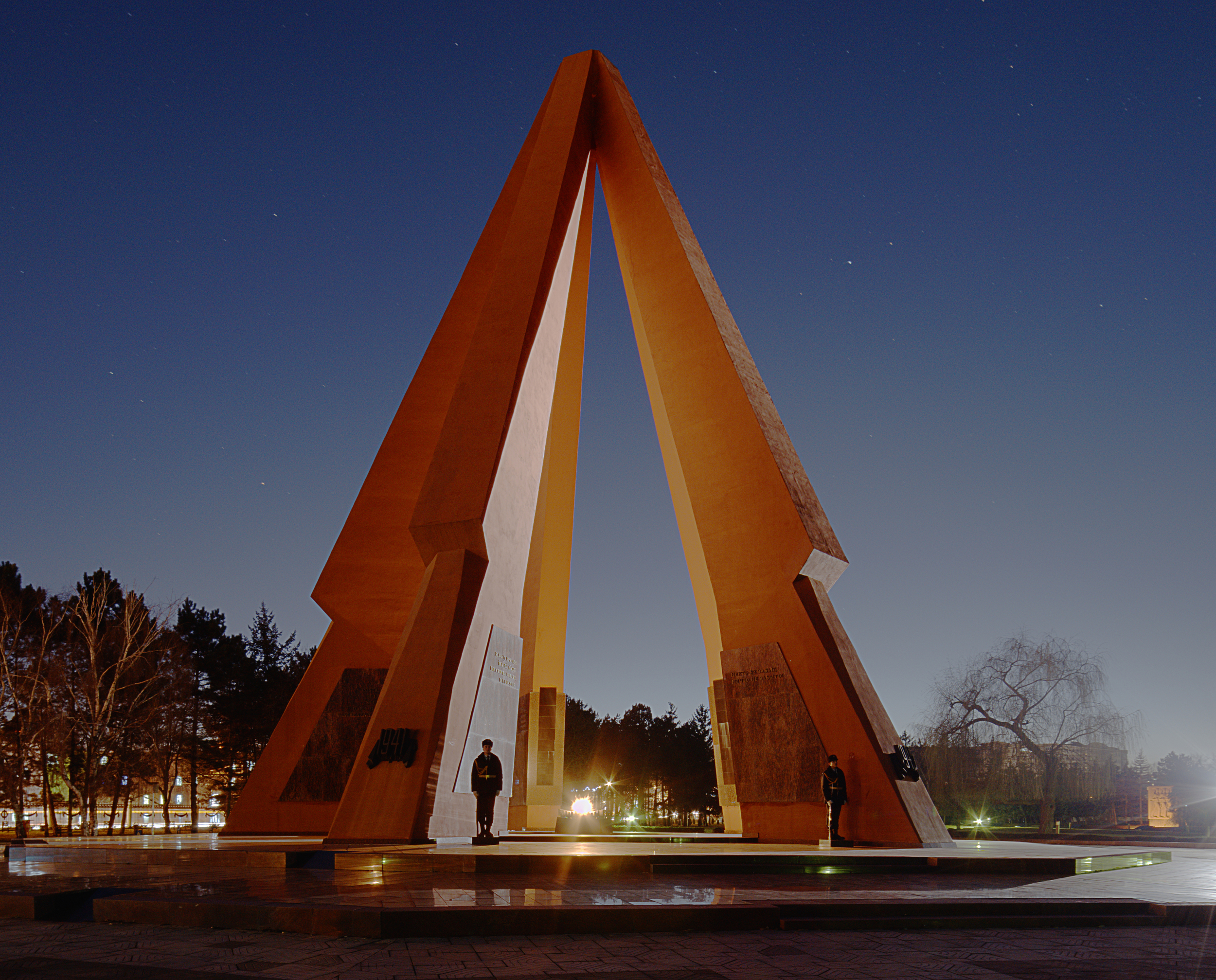
Eternity – a memorial complex dedicated to the soldiers who fell in World War II and the military conflict in Transnistria

In June 1941, in order to recover Bessarabia, Romania entered World War II under the command of the German Wehrmacht, declaring war on the Soviet Union. Chișinău was severely affected in the chaos of the Second World War. In June and July 1941, the city came under bombardment by Nazi air raids. However, the Romanian and newly Moldovan sources assign most of the responsibility for the damage to Soviet NKVD destruction battalions, which operated in Chișinău until 17 July 1941, when it was captured by Axis forces.

During the German and Romanian military administration, the city suffered from the Nazi extermination policy of its Jewish inhabitants, who were transported on trucks to the outskirts of the city and then summarily shot in partially dug pits. The number of Jews murdered during the initial occupation of the city is estimated at 10,000 people. The deportation of the city's Jews to Transnistria reduced its Jewish population from 11,388 in the fall of 1941 to 177 in 1943; a large majority of the deportees died. During this time, Chișinău, part of Lăpușna County, was the capital of the newly established Bessarabia Governorate of Romania.

As the war drew to a conclusion, the city was once again the scene of heavy fighting as German and Romanian troops retreated. Chișinău was captured by the Red Army on 24 August 1944 as a result of the Second Jassy–Kishinev offensive.

=== Soviet period ===
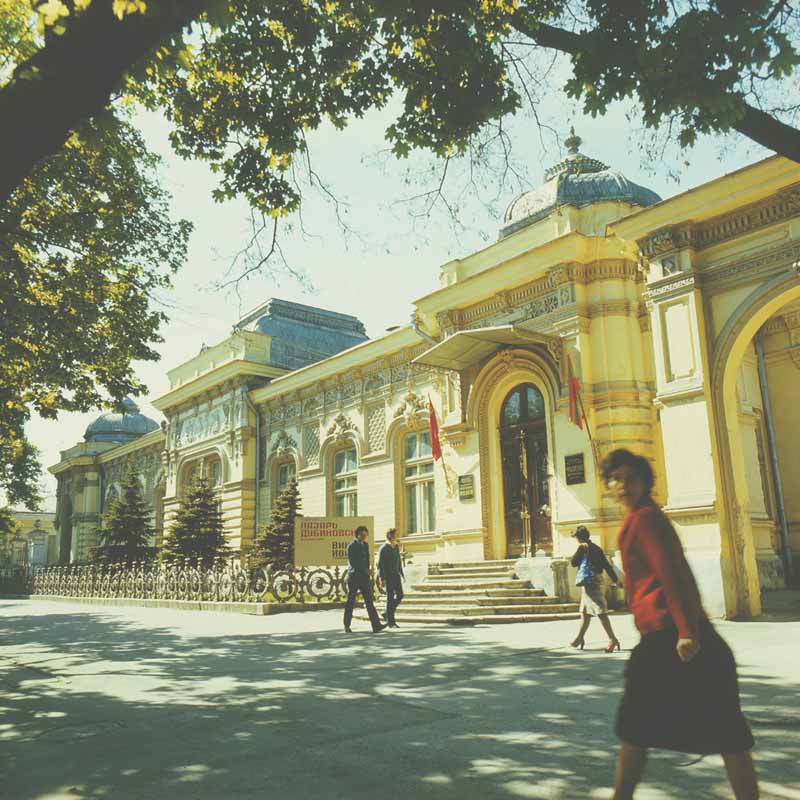
State Art Museum, during the Cold War period

After the war, Bessarabia was fully reintegrated into the Soviet Union, with around 65 percent of its territory as the Moldavian SSR, while the remaining 35 percent was transferred to the Ukrainian SSR.

Two other waves of deportations of Moldova's native population were carried out by the Soviets, the first one immediately after the Soviet reoccupation of Bessarabia until the end of the 1940s, and the second one in the mid-1950s.

Between 1947 and 1949, the architect Alexey Shchusev developed a plan with the aid of a team of architects for the gradual reconstruction of the city.

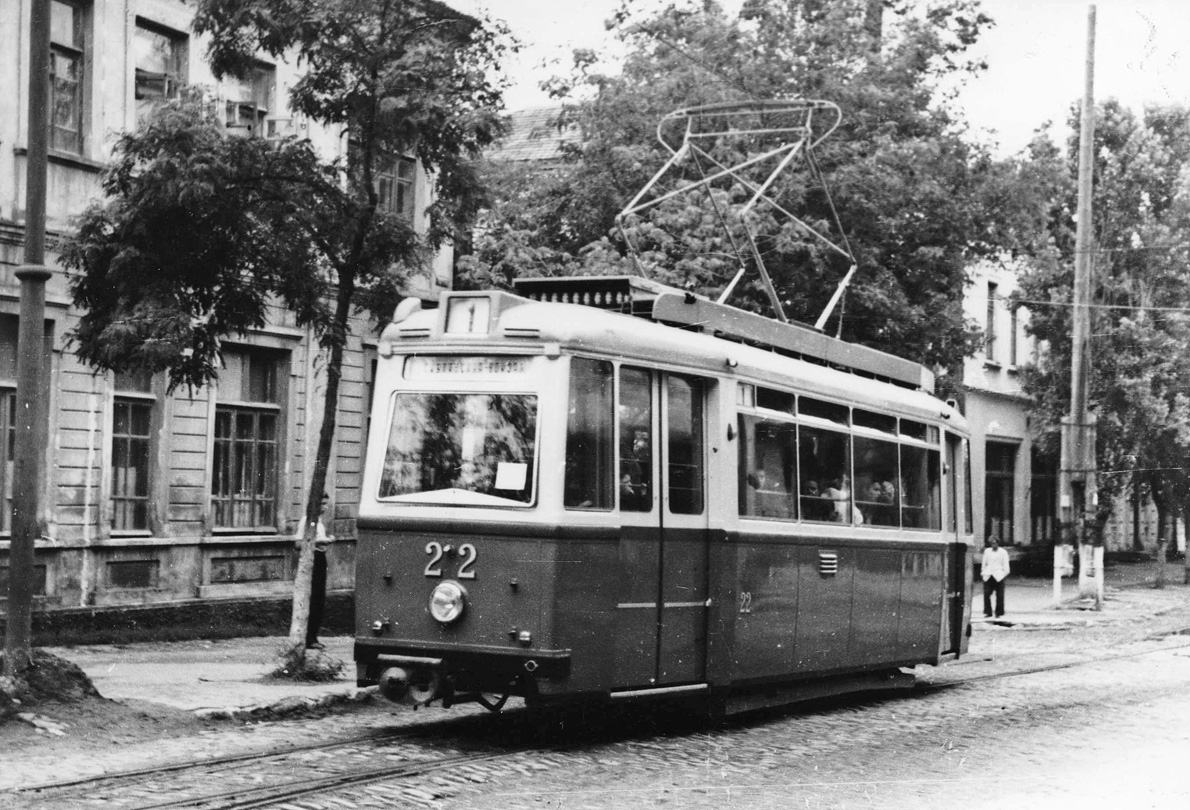
Trams in Chișinău (pictured Gothawagen ET54) were discontinued in 1961.

There was rapid population growth in the 1950s, to which the Soviet administration responded by constructing large-scale housing and palaces in the style of Stalinist architecture. This process continued under Nikita Khrushchev, who called for construction under the slogan "good, cheaper, and built faster." The new architectural style brought about dramatic change and generated the style that dominates today, with large blocks of flats arranged in considerable settlements. These Khrushchev-era buildings are often informally called Khrushchyovka.

The period of the most significant redevelopment of the city began in 1971, when the Council of Ministers of the Soviet Union adopted a decision "On the measures for further development of the city of Kishinev," which secured more than one billion rubles in investment from the state budget, and continued until the independence of Moldova in 1991. The share of dwellings built during the Soviet period (1951–1990) represents 74.3 percent of total households.

On 4 March 1977, the city was again jolted by a devastating earthquake. Several people were killed, and panic broke out. The Intourist Hotel, a flagship property constructed by the Soviet state-owned travel monopoly of the same name, was completed in 1978.

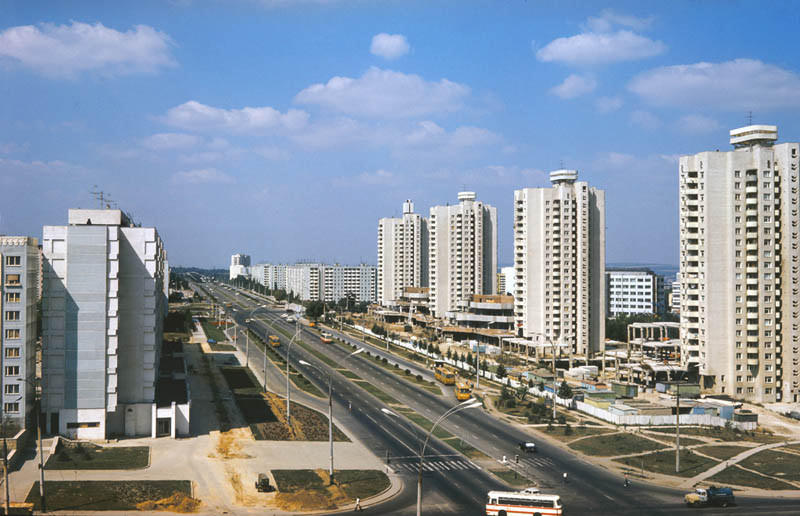
Prospectul Păcii in 1980

On 22 April 1993, the city inaugurated the Monument to the Victims of Jewish Ghettos, a public monument centred on a bronze statue of the Biblical prophet Moses, which serves as a symbol of remembrance to the thousands of Jews who perished during the holocaust. The monument was designed by sculptor Naum Epelbaum and architect Simeon Shoihet. It stands on Jerusalem Street, marking the site of the main entrance to the Chișinău Ghetto, which was established in the lower part of the city in July 1941, shortly after the German and Romanian troops occupied the area.

=== After independence ===
Since Moldovan independence following the dissolution of the Soviet Union, many streets of Chișinău have been renamed after historic persons, places, or events. Independence from the Soviet Union was followed by a large-scale renaming of streets and localities from a Communist theme into a national one.

On 5 September 2022, the country's first Christian university, Universitatea Moldo-Americană, opened its doors, supported by the Scandinavian broadcaster Visjon Norge and several donors in Norway, and run in cooperation with the American Southeastern University in Florida, United States.

Following Russia's invasion of Ukraine, Moldova allowed more than 600,000 Ukrainian civilians to flee Ukraine across their border. Despite being among the poorest states in Europe, Moldova has continued to host more than 100,000 Ukrainian refugees, many of them in Chișinău.

On 23 November 2022, the Chișinău Court of Appeal ruled that Chișinău International Airport will return to state ownership, according to justice minister Sergiu Litvinenco, more than three months after an international court allowed Moldova to terminate a 49-year concession deal with airport operator Avia Invest. In April 2023, the Dutch government opened a new embassy in Chișinău.

On 21 May 2023, tens of thousands of Moldovans took to the streets in a massive rally, the European Moldova National Assembly, to support the country's European Union membership bid. Moldovan police said more than 75,000 demonstrators were present at the rally organised by Moldovan president Maia Sandu.

Later that month, Chișinău hosted a major international summit of the European Political Community organised to discuss the illegal Russian invasion of Ukraine as well as cybersecurity, migration and energy security, and regional issues in Azerbaijan, Armenia, and clashes in Kosovo.

== Geography ==
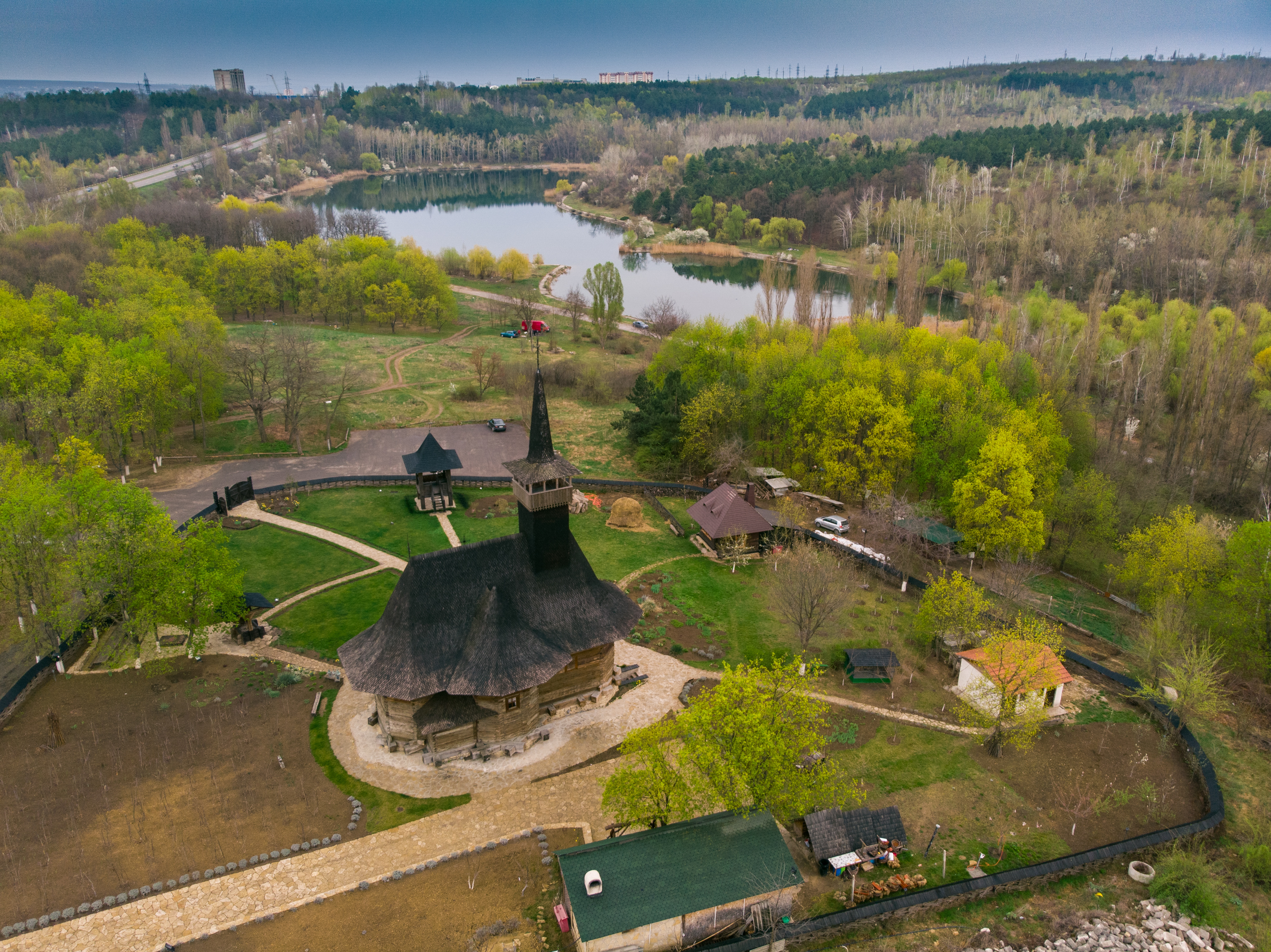
"Museum of the village" (Muzeul satului), located on the southern outskirts of the city

Chișinău is located on the river Bâc, a tributary of the Dniester, at 47°0′N 28°55′E, with an area of 120 km^{2} (46 sq mi). The municipality comprises 635 km^{2} (245 sq mi).

The city lies in central Moldova and is surrounded by a relatively level landscape with very fertile ground.

Chișinău is roughly equidistant between the borders with Romania (58 km) and Ukraine (54 km), and between the northernmost (188 km) and southernmost (179 km) points of Moldova, thus meaning that it is very close to Moldova's geographic centre.

=== Climate ===
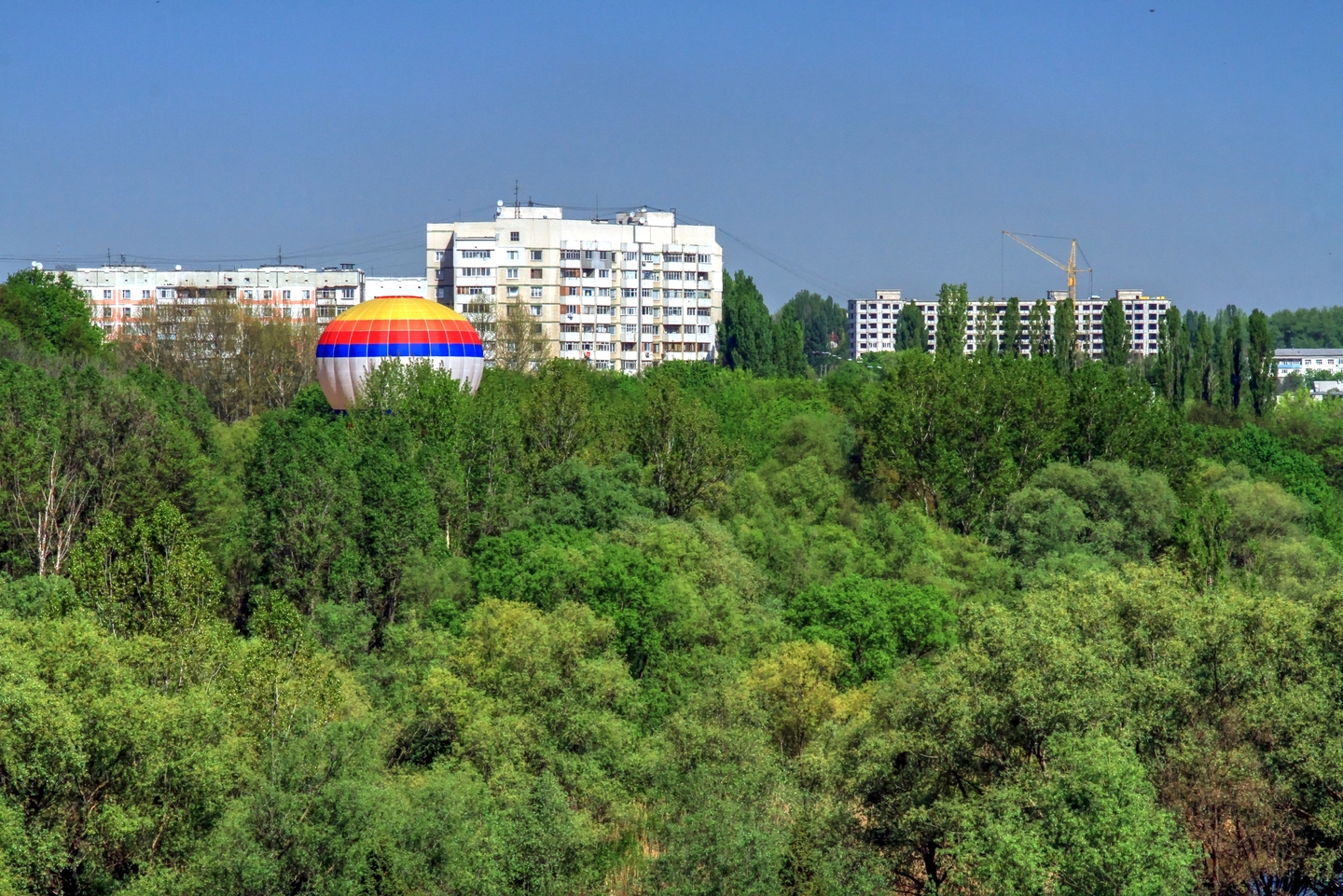
Botanical garden

Chișinău has a hot-summer humid continental climate (Köppen climate classification Dfa) characterised by hot summers and cold, windy winters. Winter minimum temperatures are often below 0 °C (32 °F), although they rarely drop below −10 °C (14 °F). In summer, the average maximum temperature is approximately 28 °C (82 °F), however, temperatures occasionally reach 35 to 40 °C (95 to 104 °F) in mid-summer in downtown. Although average humidity during summer is relatively low, most of the annual precipitation occurs during summer, causing infrequent yet heavy storms.

Spring and autumn temperatures vary between 16 and 24 °C (61 and 75 °F), and precipitation during this time tends to be lower than in summer but with more frequent yet milder periods of rain.

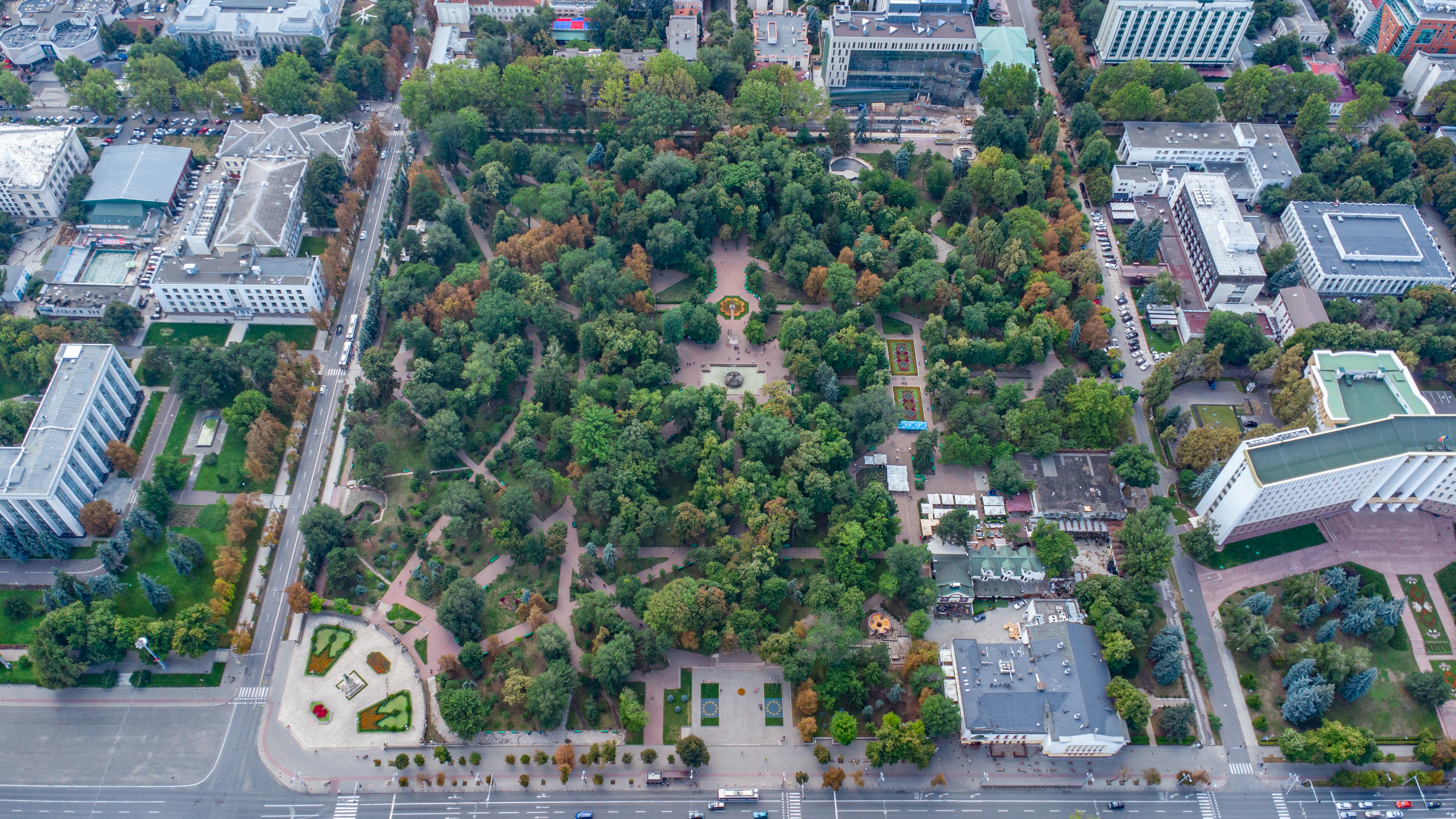
Bird's eye view of the Central park

Climate data for Chișinău (1991–2020, extremes 1886–present)
Month	Jan	Feb	Mar	Apr	May	Jun	Jul	Aug	Sep	Oct	Nov	Dec	Year
Record high °C (°F)	16.6 (61.9)	20.7 (69.3)	25.7 (78.3)	31.6 (88.9)	35.9 (96.6)	37.5 (99.5)	39.4 (102.9)	39.2 (102.6)	37.3 (99.1)	32.6 (90.7)	23.8 (74.8)	18.3 (64.9)	39.4 (102.9)
Mean daily maximum °C (°F)	1.1 (34.0)	3.4 (38.1)	9.2 (48.6)	16.4 (61.5)	22.3 (72.1)	26.1 (79.0)	28.4 (83.1)	28.3 (82.9)	22.3 (72.1)	15.5 (59.9)	8.1 (46.6)	2.7 (36.9)	15.3 (59.5)
Daily mean °C (°F)	−1.8 (28.8)	−0.2 (31.6)	4.5 (40.1)	11.0 (51.8)	16.8 (62.2)	20.7 (69.3)	22.9 (73.2)	22.6 (72.7)	17.0 (62.6)	10.8 (51.4)	4.8 (40.6)	−0.2 (31.6)	10.7 (51.3)
Mean daily minimum °C (°F)	−4.2 (24.4)	−3.0 (26.6)	0.7 (33.3)	6.3 (43.3)	11.8 (53.2)	15.9 (60.6)	17.9 (64.2)	17.5 (63.5)	12.5 (54.5)	7.1 (44.8)	2.1 (35.8)	−2.5 (27.5)	6.8 (44.2)
Record low °C (°F)	−28.4 (−19.1)	−28.9 (−20.0)	−21.1 (−6.0)	−6.6 (20.1)	−1.1 (30.0)	3.6 (38.5)	7.8 (46.0)	5.5 (41.9)	−2.4 (27.7)	−10.8 (12.6)	−21.6 (−6.9)	−22.4 (−8.3)	−28.9 (−20.0)
Average precipitation mm (inches)	36 (1.4)	31 (1.2)	35 (1.4)	39 (1.5)	54 (2.1)	65 (2.6)	67 (2.6)	49 (1.9)	48 (1.9)	47 (1.9)	43 (1.7)	41 (1.6)	555 (21.8)
Average extreme snow depth cm (inches)	7 (2.8)	6 (2.4)	3 (1.2)	0 (0)	0 (0)	0 (0)	0 (0)	0 (0)	0 (0)	0 (0)	1 (0.4)	3 (1.2)	7 (2.8)
Average rainy days	8	7	11	13	14	14	12	10	10	11	12	10	132
Average snowy days	13	13	8	0	0	0	0	0	0	0	6	11	51
Average relative humidity (%)	82	78	71	63	60	63	62	60	66	73	81	83	70
Mean monthly sunshine hours	70	96	155	210	283	301	326	308	220	162	81	65	2,277
Source 1: Pogoda.ru.net
Source 2: NOAA (sun, 1991–2020)

== Law and government ==
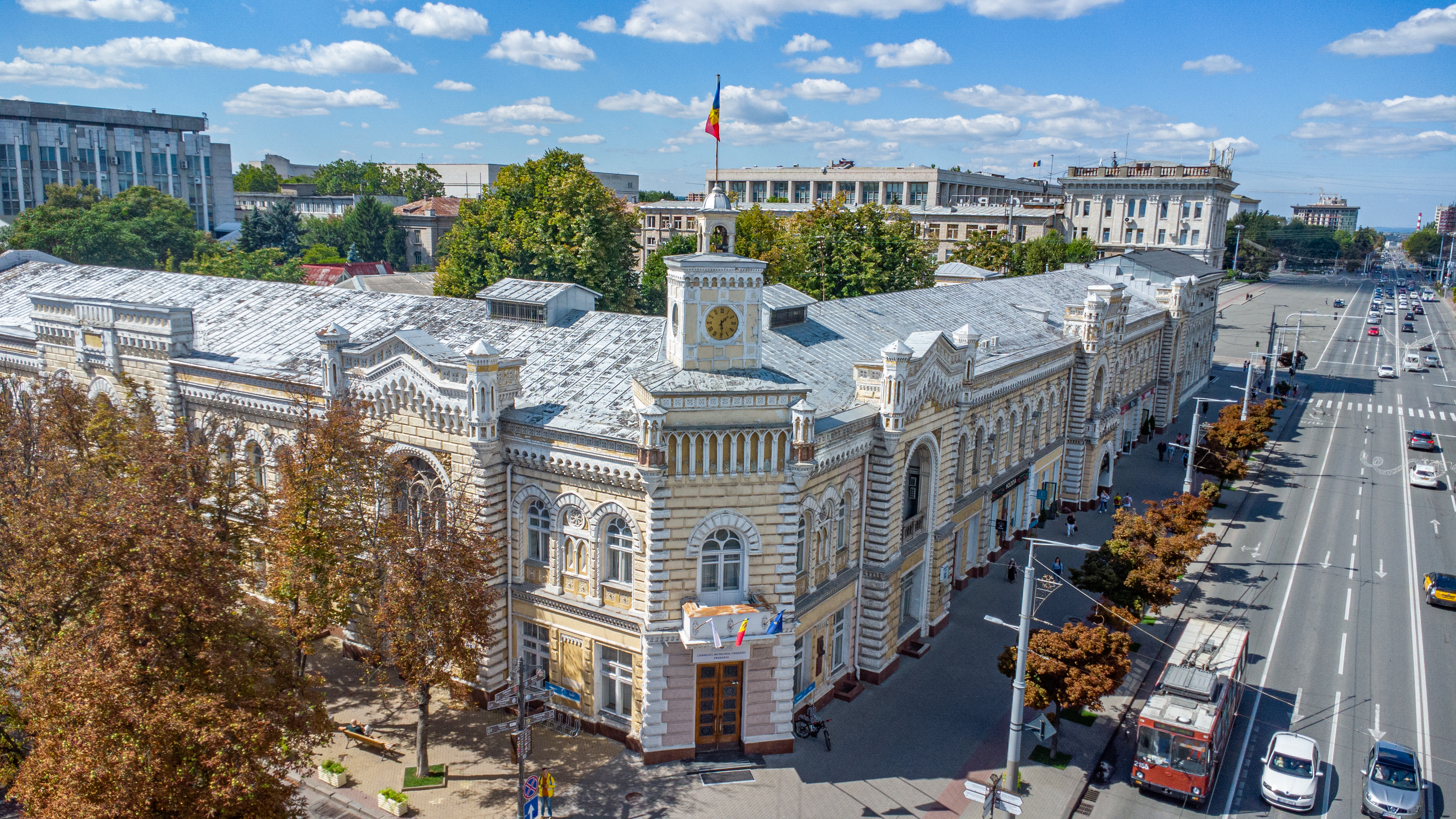
Chișinău City Hall

=== Government and politics ===
Chișinău is governed by the Municipal Council and the Mayor (Romanian: Primar), both elected once every four years. Ion Ceban was elected mayor first in 2019 and again in 2023. During his first term, he formed a new political party, the National Alternative Movement, of which he was elected president in 2022.

The 2023 election also brought in a new city council. The percentages of votes and the resulting number of seats for parties represented in the council are listed below.

Results of 2023 City Council Election
Party	Vote	Seats
National Alternative Movement	33.1%	20
Party of Action and Solidarity	32.9%	20
Party of Socialists	9.6%	6
Party of Communists	4.5%	2
Revival Party	2.6%	1
Dignity and Truth Platform	2.6%	1
Our Party	1.7%	1

=== Municipal administration ===
Chișinău and its surroundings on a map of districts of Moldova

Moldova is administratively subdivided into 3 municipalities, 32 districts, and 2 autonomous units. With a population of 720,128 inhabitants (as of the 2024 Moldovan census), the Municipality of Chișinău (which includes the nearby communities) is the largest of these municipalities.

Besides the city itself, the municipality comprises 34 other suburban localities: 6 towns (containing further 2 villages within), and 12 communes (containing further 14 villages within). The population, as of the 2014 Moldovan census, is shown in brackets:

==== Cities/towns ====
- Chișinău (567,038)
- Codru (18,310)
- Cricova (9,536)
- Durlești (26,308)
- Sîngera (12,368)
  - Dobrogea
  - Revaca
- Vadul lui Vodă (4,280)
- Vatra (3,391)

==== Communes ====
- Băcioi (11,663)
  - Brăila
  - Frumușica
  - Străisteni
- Bubuieci (11,152)
  - Bîc
  - Humulești
- Budești (4,425)
  - Văduleni
- Ciorescu (6,714)
  - Făurești
  - Goian
- Colonița (3,956)
- Condrița (547)
- Cruzești (1,709)
  - Ceroborta
- Ghidighici (5,240)
- Grătiești (6,183)
  - Hulboaca
- Stăuceni (11,210)
  - Goianul Nou
- Tohatin (4,045)
  - Buneți
  - Cheltuitori
- Trușeni (10,937)
  - Dumbrava

===== Administrative sectors =====
Administrative sectors of Chișinău: 1-Centru, 2-Buiucani, 3-Râșcani, 4-Botanica, 5-Ciocana

The municipality in its totality elects a mayor and a local council, which then name five pretors, one for each sector. They deal more locally with administrative matters. Each sector claims a part of the city and several suburbs:

Centru
- Codru
Buiucani
- Durlești
- Vatra
- Condrița
- Ghidighici
- Trușeni
  - Dumbrava
Râșcani
- Cricova
- Ciorescu
  - Făurești
  - Goian
- Grătiești
  - Hulboaca
- Stăuceni
  - Goianul Nou
Botanica
- Sîngera
  - Dobrogea
  - Revaca
- Băcioi
  - Brăila
  - Frumușica
  - Străisteni
Ciocana
- Vadul lui Vodă
- Bubuieci
  - Bîc
  - Humulești
- Budești,
  - Văduleni
- Colonița
- Cruzești
  - Ceroborta
- Tohatin
  - Buneți
  - Cheltuitori

== Economy ==
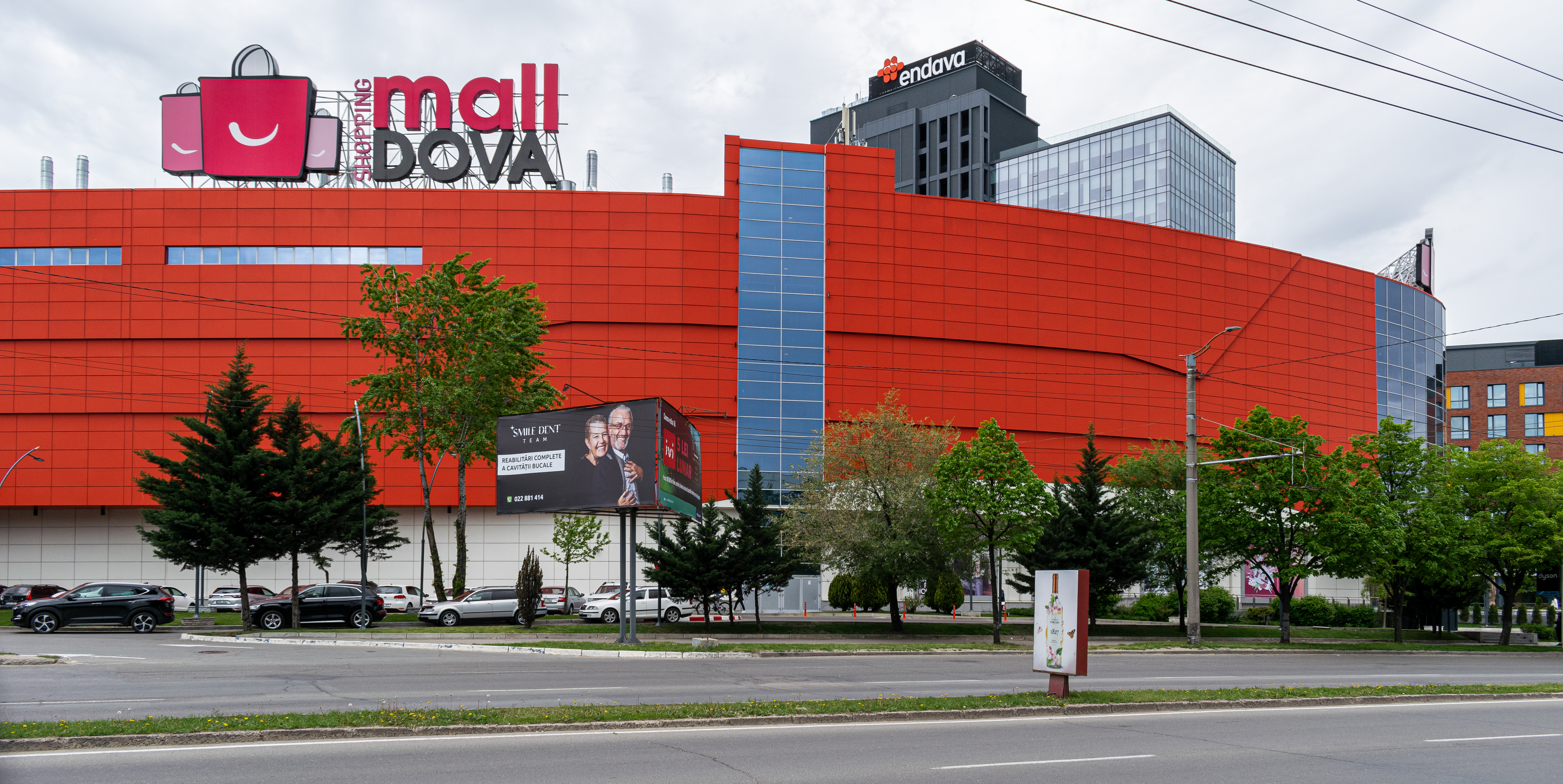
MallDova shopping centre

Historically, the city was home to fourteen factories in 1919. Chișinău is the financial and business capital of Moldova. Its GDP comprises about 60% of the national economy reached in 2012 the amount of 52 billion lei (US$4 billion). Thus, the GDP per capita of Chișinău stood at 227% of the Moldova's average. Chișinău has the largest and most developed mass media sector in Moldova, and is home to several related companies ranging from leading television networks and radio stations to major newspapers. All national and international banks (15) have their headquarters located in Chișinău.

Notable sites around Chișinău include Cineplex Loteanu, the new malls MallDova, Port Mall, and best-known retailers, such as Nr1, Linella, Kaufland, Fourchette, and Metro. While many locals continue to shop at the bazaars, many upper class residents and tourists shop at the retail stores and at MallDova. Jumbo, an older mall in the Botanica district, and Sun City, in the centre, are more popular with locals.

Several amusement parks exist around the city. A Soviet-era one is located in the Botanica district, along the three lakes of a major park, which reaches the outskirts of the city centre. Another, the modern Aventura Park, is located farther from the centre. The Chișinău State Circus, which used to be in a grand building in the Râșcani sector, has been inactive for several years due to a poorly funded renovation project.

== Demographics ==
Chișinău population pyramid in 2021

Natural statistics (2015)

- Births: 6,845 (9.8 per 1,000)
- Deaths: 6,433 (7.7 per 1,000)
- Net Growth rate: 412 (2.1 per 1,000)

Population by sector:

Sector	Population (2004 census)	Population (2019 estimate)	Population (2024 census)
Botanica	156,633	170,600	144,824
Buiucani	107,744	110,100	100,985
Centru	90,494	96,200	87,230
Ciocana	101,834	115,900	105,680
Râșcani	132,740	146,200	128,319

=== Ethnic composition ===
Historical population
Year	Pop.	±%
1812	7,000	—
1818	10,966	+56.7%
1835	34,079	+210.8%
1847	43,965	+29.0%
1851	58,849	+33.9%
1865	94,047	+59.8%
1897(c)	108,483	+15.3%
1912	121,000	+11.5%
1930(c)	114,896	−5.0%
1959(c)	216,005	+88.0%
1970(c)	363,940	+68.5%
1979(c)	589,140	+61.9%
1989(c)	714,928	+21.4%
2004(c)	712,218	−0.4%
2014(c)	662,836	−6.9%
2024(c)	720,128	+8.6%
Sources: c = census; e = estimate

Population of Chișinău according to ethnic group (1959–2024 censuses)
Ethnic group	1959		1970		1989		2004		2014		2024	
Ethnic group	Number	%	Number	%	Number	%	Number	%	Number	%	Number	%
Moldovans^{*}	69,722	32.38	137,942	37.90	366,468	51.26	481,626	68.94	304,860	67.18	521,837	72.46
Romanians^{*}	331	0.15	513	0.14	–		31,984	4.58	65,605	14.46	92,988	12.91
Russians	69,600	32.22	110,449	30.35	181,002	25.32	99,149	14.19	42,174	9.29	42,796	5.94
Ukrainians	25,930	12.00	51,103	14.04	98,190	13.73	58,945	8.44	26,991	5.95	38,701	5.37
Bulgarians	1,811	0.84	3,855	1.06	9,224	1.29	8,868	1.27	4,850	1.07	6,505	0.90
Gagauz	1,476	0.68	2,666	0.73	6,155	0.86	6,446	0.92	3,108	0.68	5,590	0.78
Others	45,626	21.12	54,688	15.03	47,525	6.65	11,605	1.66	6,210	1.37	11,711	1.63
Total	216,005		363,940		714,928		712,218		469,402		720,128	
Sources: 1959, 1970, 1979, 1989, 2004, and 2024.
*Since the independence of Moldova, there is an ongoing controversy over whether Moldovans and Romanians are the same ethnic group. *In 2014, part of the population weren't reviewed.

=== Languages ===
Languages usually spoken in Chișinău (1989–2024 censuses)
First language (%)	1989	2004	2014	Speakers 2024	2024
Romanian^{*}	–	37.06	43.78	343,146	47.65
Moldovan^{*}	46.15	28.56	29.55	206,594	28.69
Russian	44.73	33.50	25.64	141,807	19.70
Other languages	9.12	0.88	1.03	28,581	3.97
*The Moldovan language represents the glottonym (dialect) given to the Romanian language.

=== Religion ===
Chișinău is the seat of the Moldovan Orthodox Church, as well as of the Metropolis of Bessarabia. The city has multiple churches and synagogues.

According to the 2024 census results, the religious structure of Chișinău was the following:

Population of Chișinău according to religion
Religious group	2024	
Religious group	Number	%
Eastern Orthodoxy	665,659	92.44
Baptist	4,705	0.65
Jehovah's Witnesses	3,868	0.54
Evangelical	1,864	0.26
Catholic	1,463	0.20
Pentecostal	1,458	0.20
Other Christians	1,161	0.16
Christianity (total)	680,178	94.45
Islam	2,182	0.30
Other religions	3,164	0.44
Agnostic / Atheist	13,409	1.86
No religion	12,377	1.72
Undeclared	8,818	1.22
Total	720,128	
Source: National Bureau of Statistics

== Cityscape ==
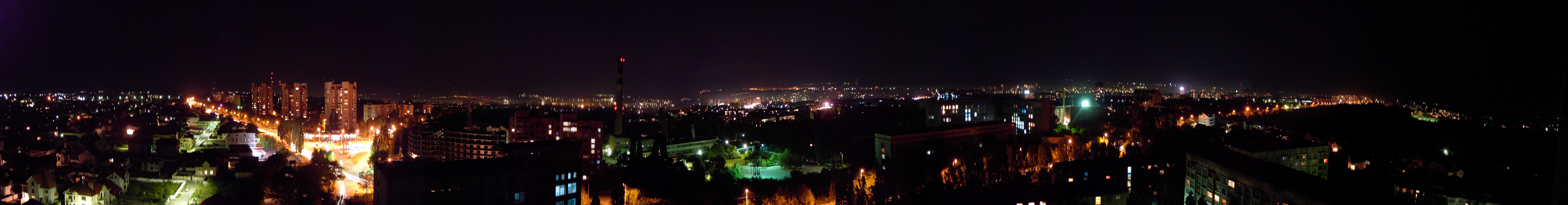
Panorama of Chișinău at night

=== Architecture ===
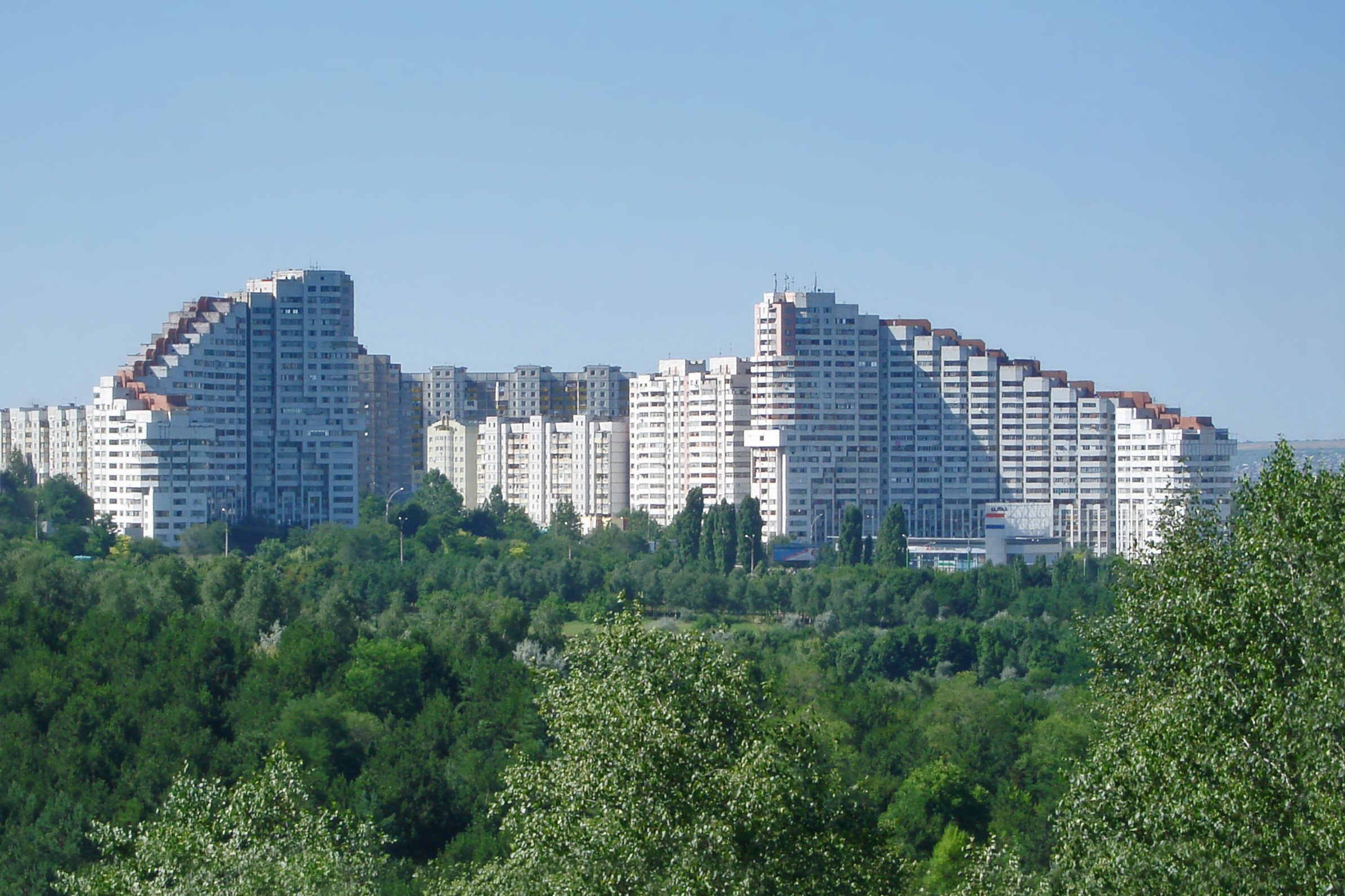
Soviet-style apartment buildings in Chișinău

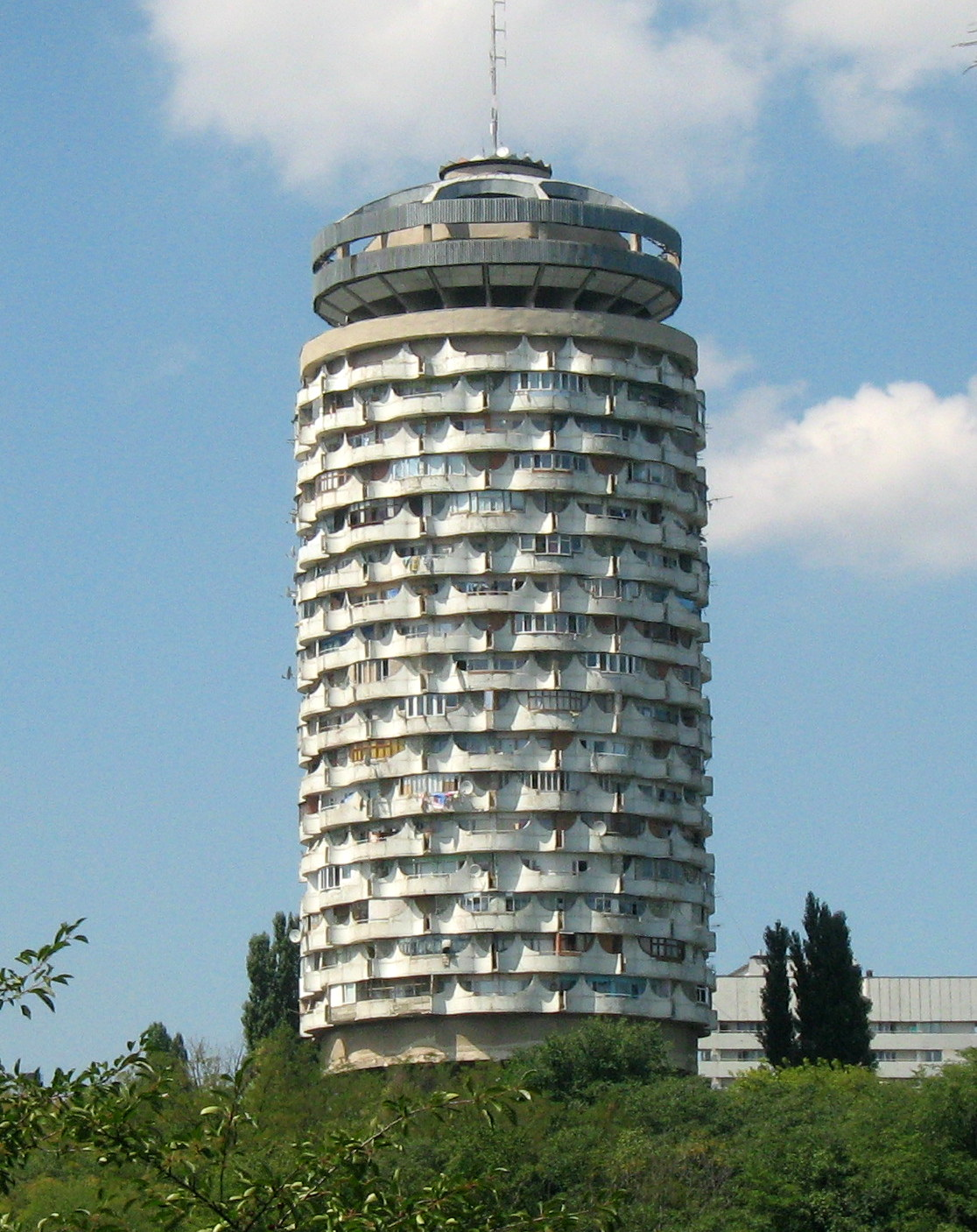
Romashka Tower, the tallest building in Moldova

Chișinău's growth plan was developed in the 19th century. In 1836, the construction of the Kishinev Cathedral and its belfry was finished. The belfry was demolished in Soviet times and was rebuilt in 1997. Chișinău also displays a tremendous number of Orthodox churches and 19th-century buildings around the city such as Ciuflea Monastery or the Transfiguration Church. Much of the city is made from limestone quarried from Cricova, leaving a famous wine cellar there.

Many modern-style buildings have been built in the city since 1991. There are many office and shopping complexes that are modern, renovated or newly built, including Kentford, SkyTower, and Unión Fenosa headquarters. However, the old Soviet-style clusters of living blocks are still an extensive feature of the cityscape.

== Culture and education ==
=== Education ===
The city is home to 8 public and 4 private universities, the Academy of Sciences of Moldova, a number of institutions offering high school and 1–2 years of college education. Among them are Moldova State University, the Academy of Economic Studies of Moldova, Alexandru cel Bun Military Academy, Nicolae Testemițanu State University of Medicine and Pharmacy, and Ion Creangă State Pedagogical University.

On 5 September 2022, the country's first Christian university Universitatea Moldo-Americană opened its doors, supported by the Scandinavian broadcaster Visjon Norge and several donors in Norway, and run in cooperation with the American Southeastern University in Florida, United States.

In Chișinău there are several museums. The three national museums are the National Museum of Ethnography and Natural History, the National Museum of Fine Arts, and the National Museum of History of Moldova. The National Museum of Ethnography and Natural History was founded in October 1889 by baron Alexandru Stuart, moved to its current location in 1905, and is the oldest museum in Moldova. It houses more than 135,000 exhibit pieces, among them a life-sized reconstruction of the skeleton of a dinothere, discovered in the Rezine region in 1966. It also includes exhibits on natural history, natural sciences, archaeology, paleontology, geology, and ethnography. The building was designed by the architect Vladimir Tsyganko in a distinctive Moorish architectural style with a signature frontal façade consisting of a triangular pediment supported by two Doric columns.

The National Library of Moldova is also located in Chișinău.

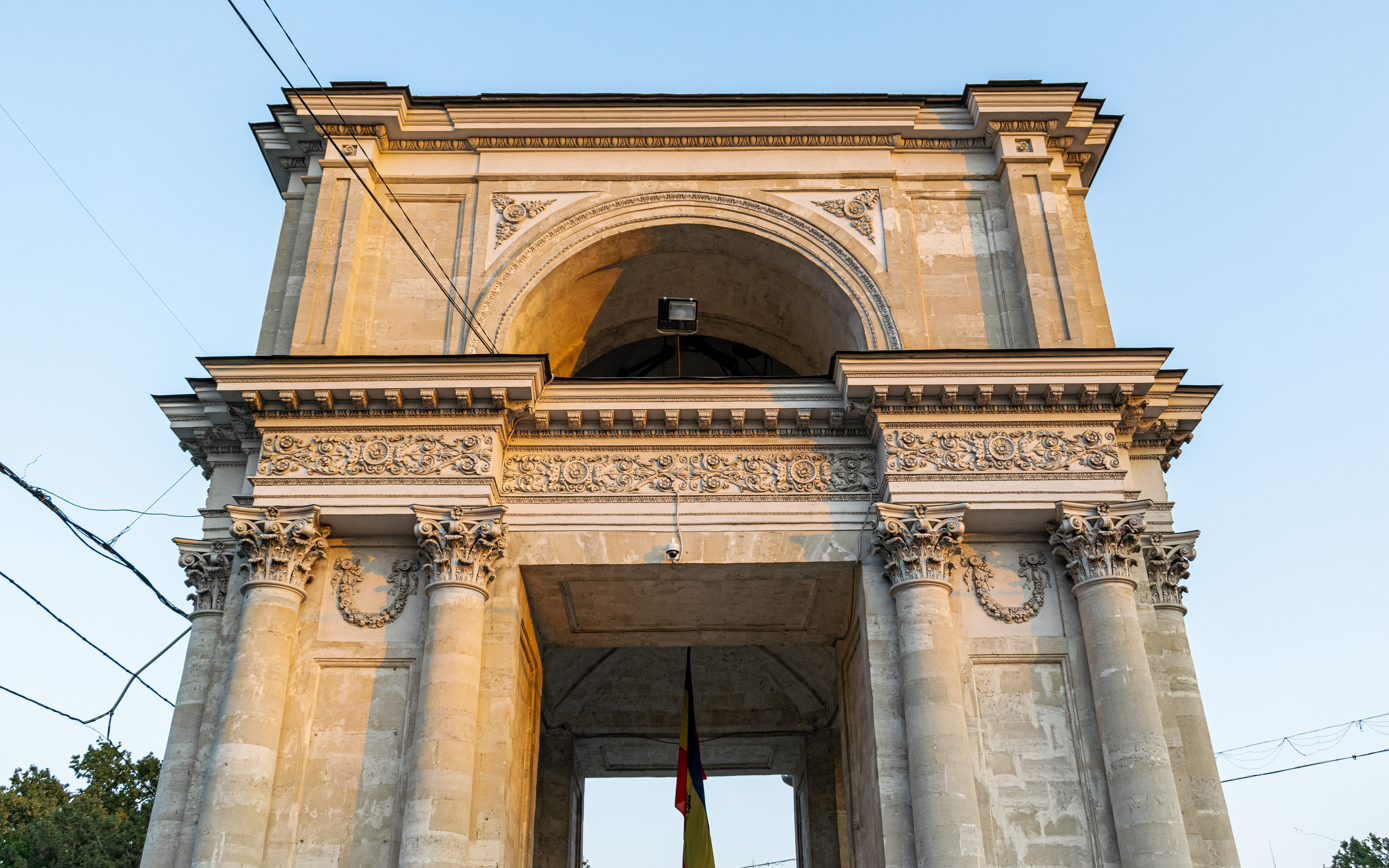
Triumphal Arch

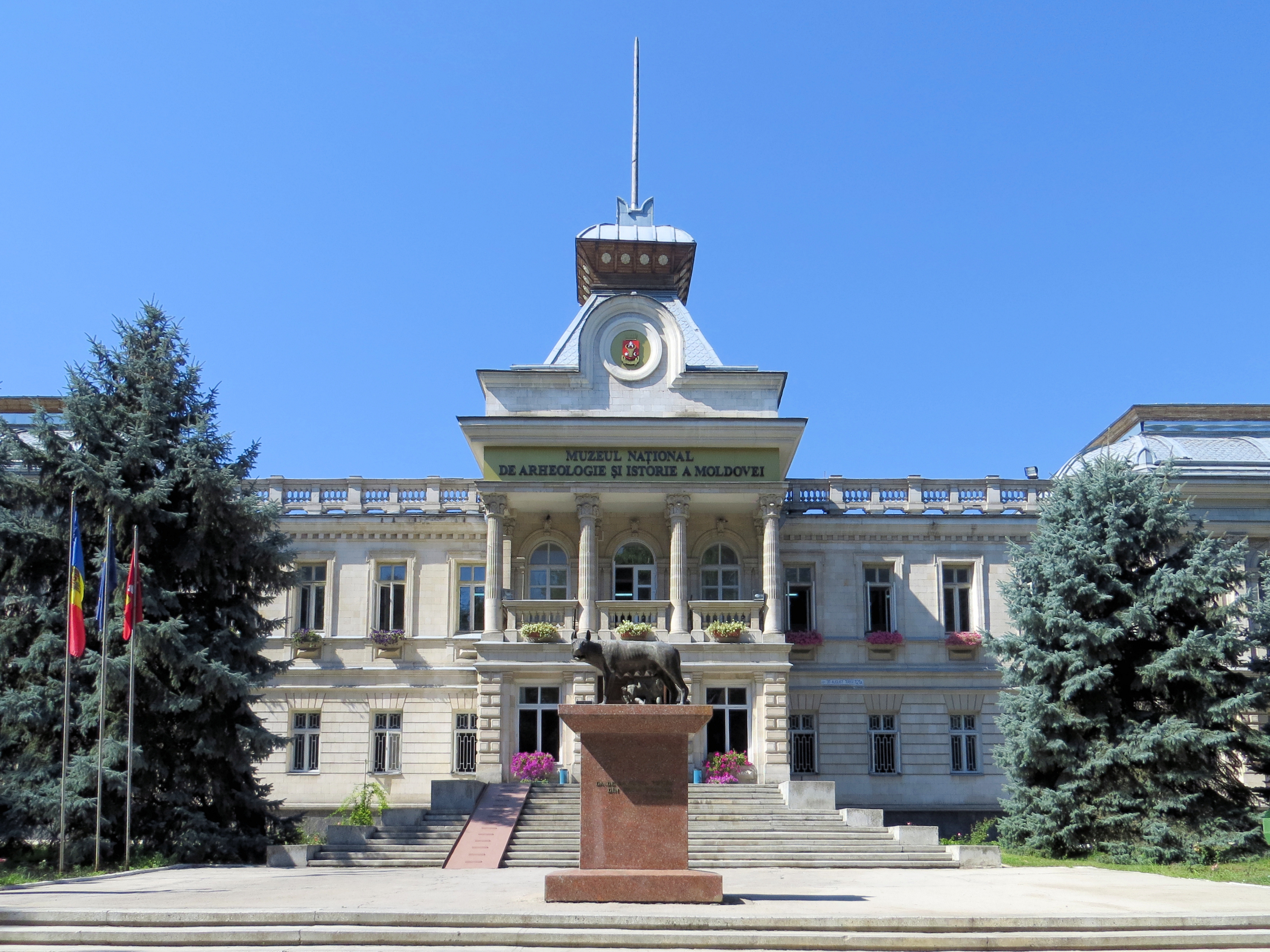
Capitoline Wolf and National History Museum

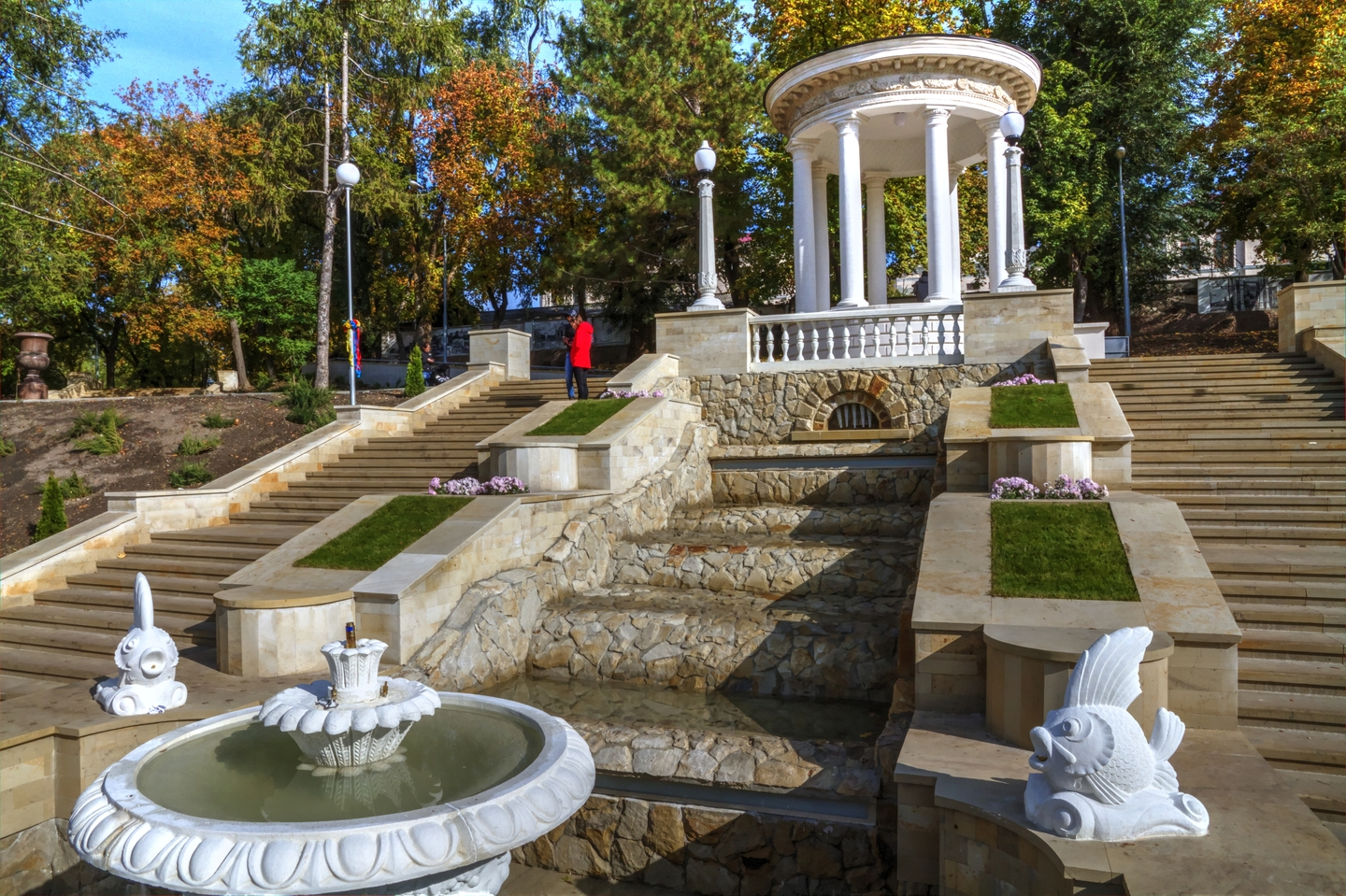
Waterfall Steps at the Mill Valley Park

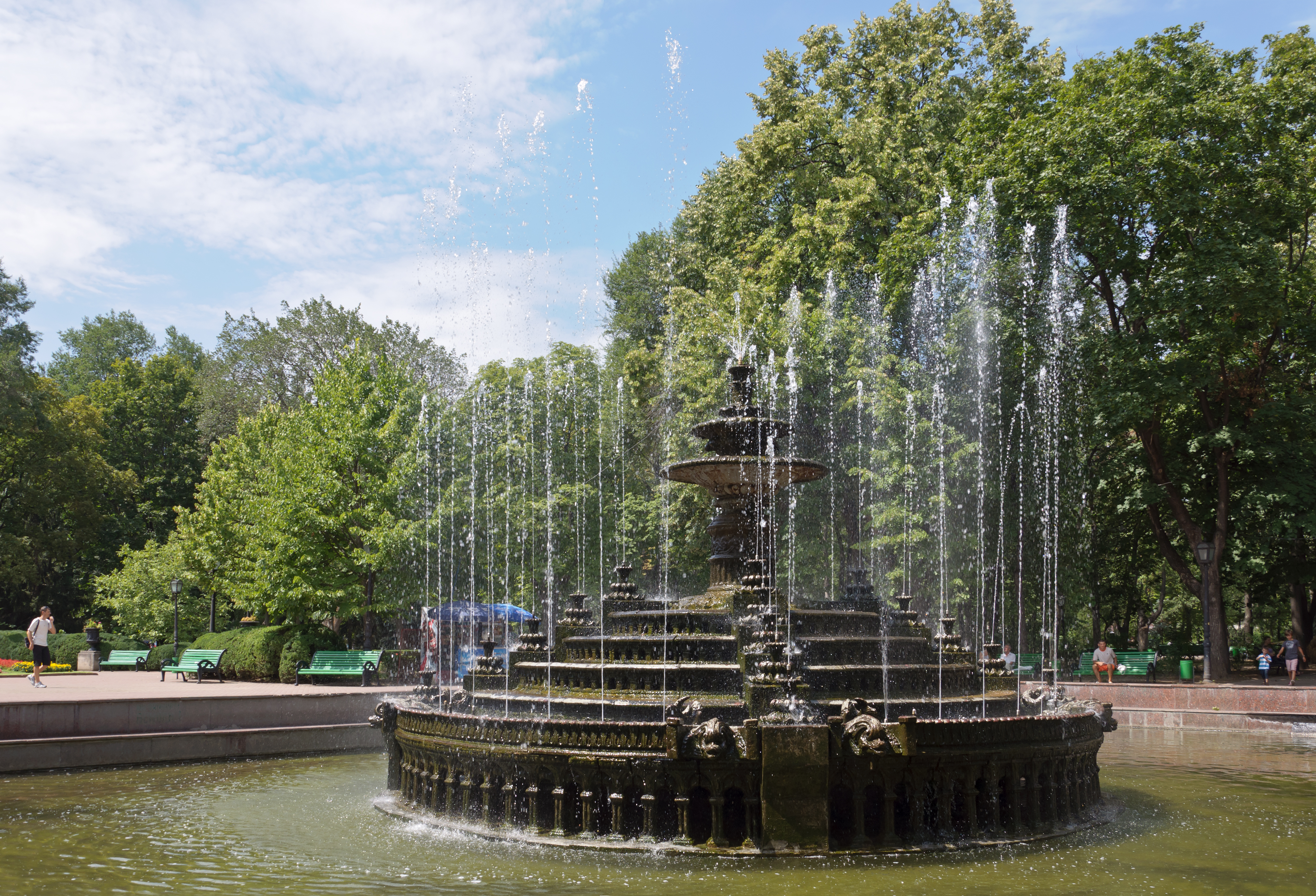
Ștefan cel Mare Central Park

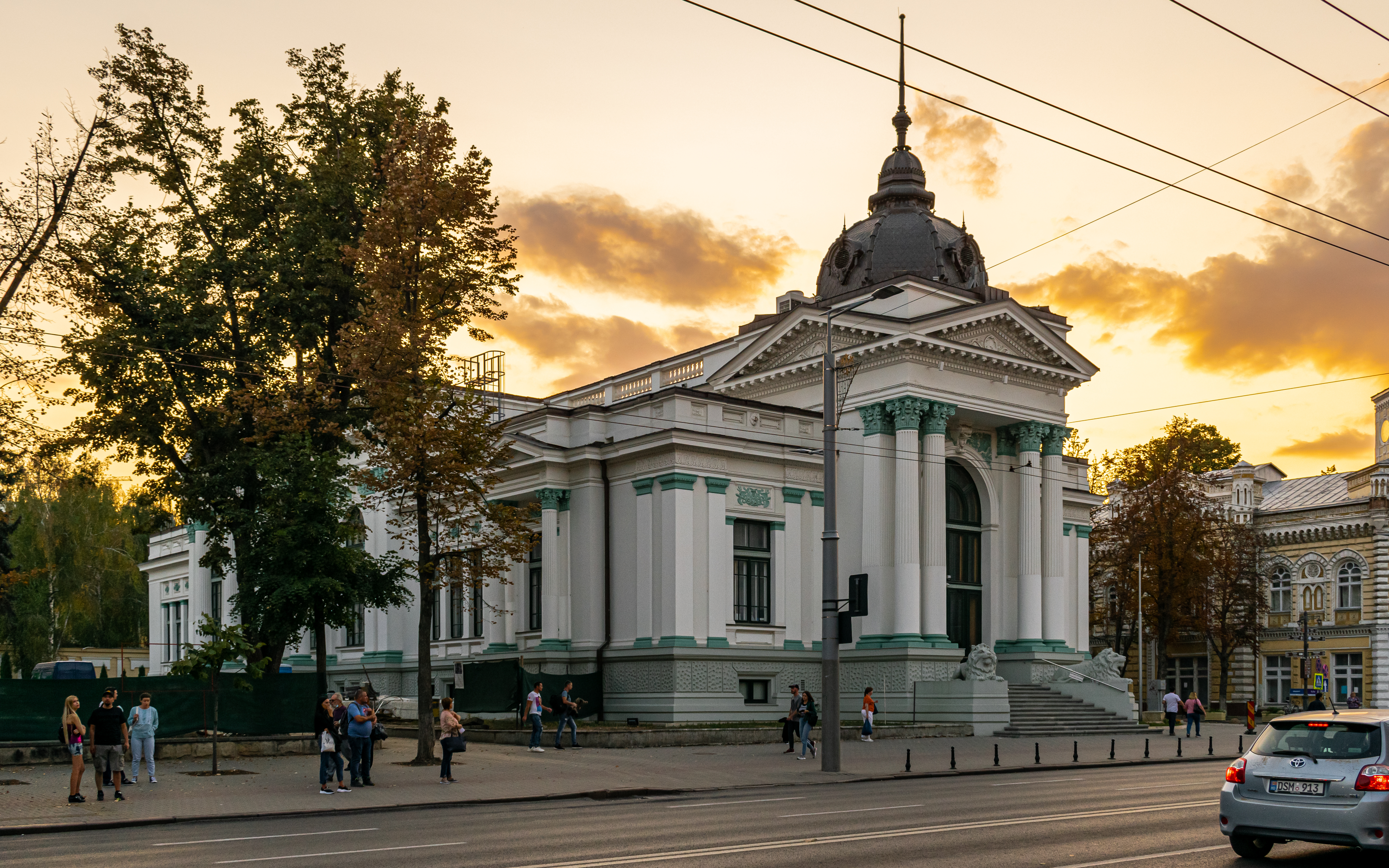
Organ Hall

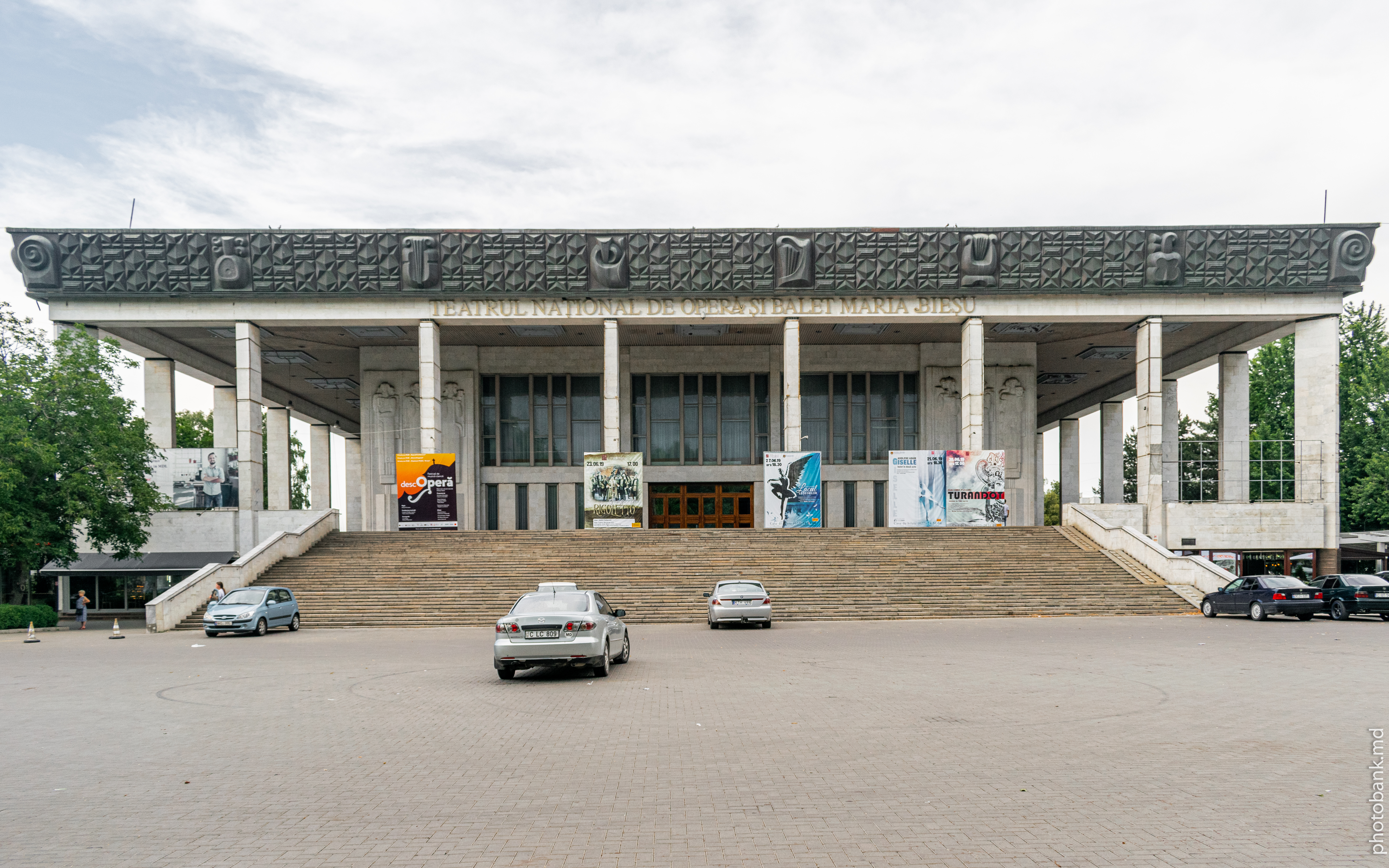
Maria Bieșu National Opera and Ballet Theatre

=== Events and festivals ===
Chișinău, as well as Moldova as a whole, still show signs of ethnic culture. Signs that say "Patria Mea" (English: My homeland) can be found all over the capital. While few people still wear traditional Moldavian attire, large public events often draw in such original costumes.

Moldova National Wine Day and Wine Festival take place every year in the first weekend of October, in Chișinău. The events celebrate the autumn harvest and recognises the country's long history of winemaking, which dates back to at least 3,000 BCE. Moldova has been called the wine capital of Europe and its yearly festival is a major cultural and tourist event, and every year the streets are filled with people enjoying food, wine, dance, and music taking over the streets. Moldova's most-awarded sommelier Mihai Druta has described Moldovan wine as being about "small producers and family wineries making premium wine. And nothing costs more than 100 Euro a bottle." The Daily Express in 2019 described the city as "Europe's latest hotspot" in which journalist Maisha Frost praised "its wines, monumental wineries and their epic tasting sessions."

== Media ==
The majority of Moldova's media industry is based in Chișinău. There are almost 30 FM-radio stations and 10 TV-channels broadcasting in Chișinău. The first radio station in Chișinău, Radio Basarabia, was launched by the Romanian Radio Broadcasting Company on 8 October 1939, when the religious service was broadcast on air from the Nativity Cathedral. The first TV station in the city, Moldova 1, was launched on 30 April 1958, while Nicolae Lupan was serving as the redactor-in-chief of Teleradio-Moldova.

The state national broadcaster in the country is the state-owned Moldova 1, which has its head office in the city. The broadcasts of Teleradio-Moldova have been criticised by the Independent Journalism Center as showing 'bias' towards the authorities.

Other TV channels based in Chișinău are TV8, Jurnal TV, ProTV Chișinău, Prime, Publika TV, CTC, DTV, Euro TV etc. In addition to television, most Moldovan radio and newspaper companies have their headquarters in the city. Broadcasters include the national radio Vocea Basarabiei, Prime FM, BBC Moldova, Radio Europa Libera, Kiss FM Chișinău, Pro FM Chișinău, Radio 21, Fresh FM, Radio Nova, Russkoye Radio, Hit FM Moldova, and many others.

The biggest broadcasters are StarNet (IPTV), Moldtelecom (IPTV), Sun TV, Satellit, and Zebra TV. In 2007, Sun TV and Zebra launched digital TV cable networks.

== Politics ==
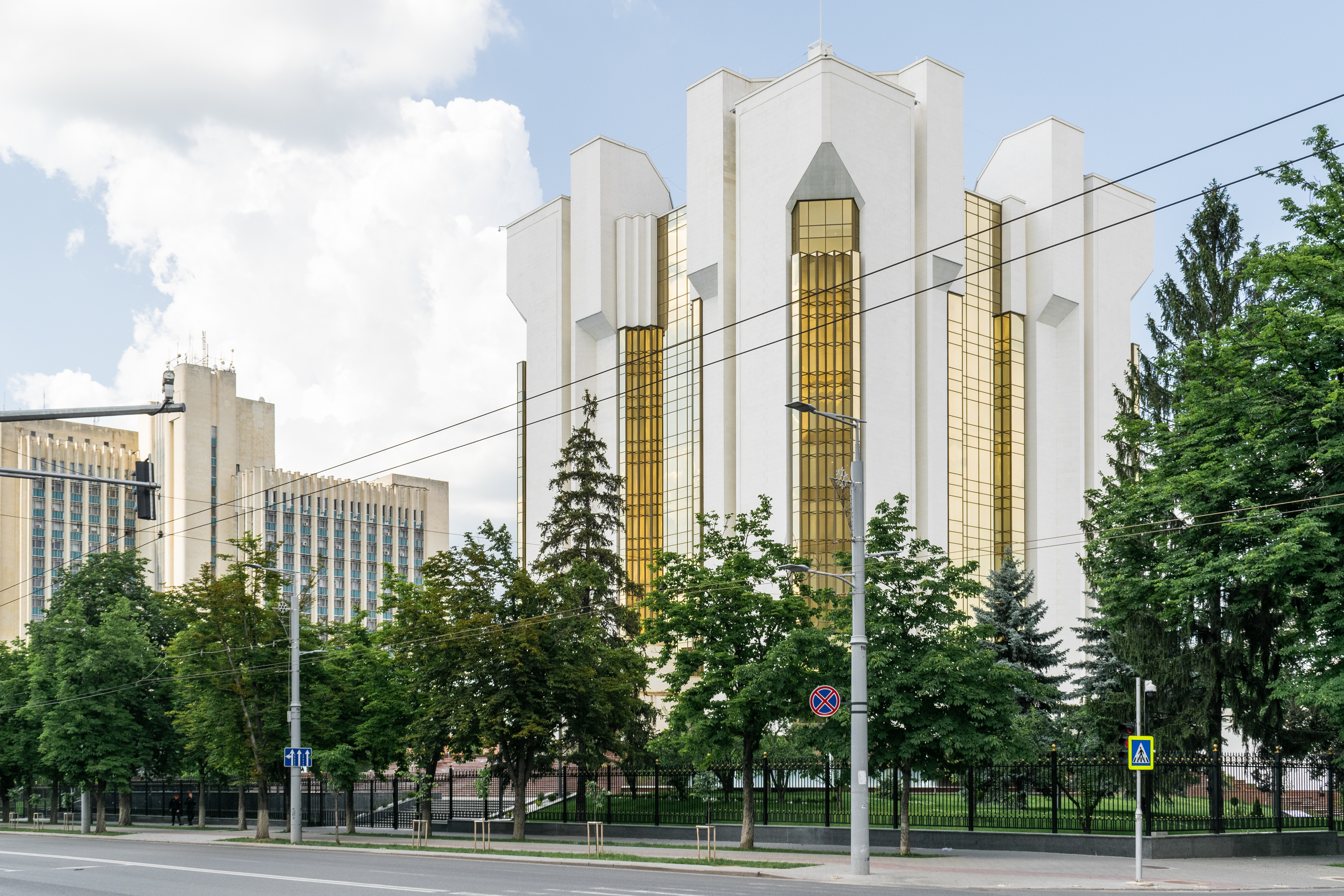
Presidential Palace in Chișinău

== Transport ==
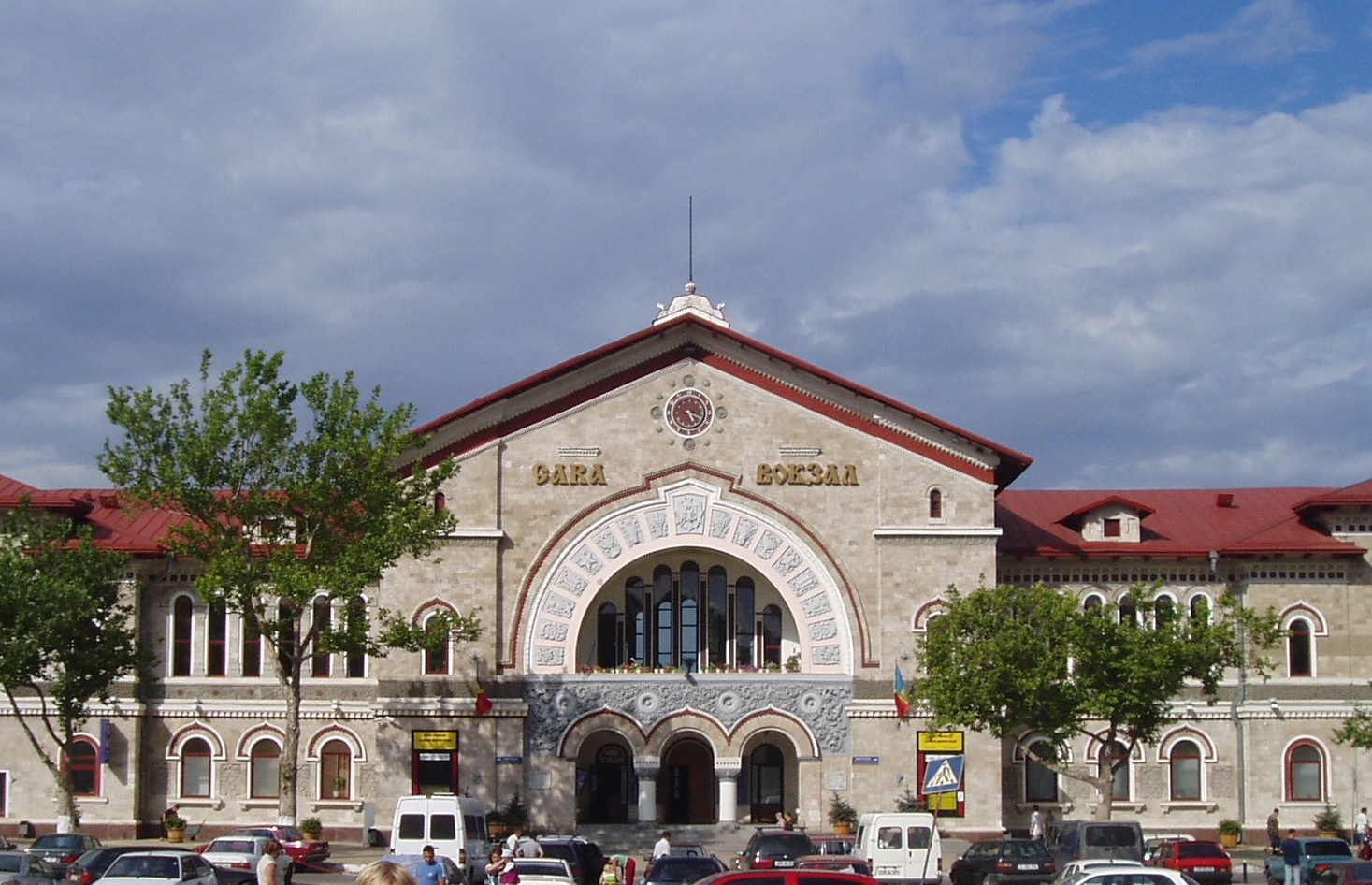
Chișinău railway station, exterior

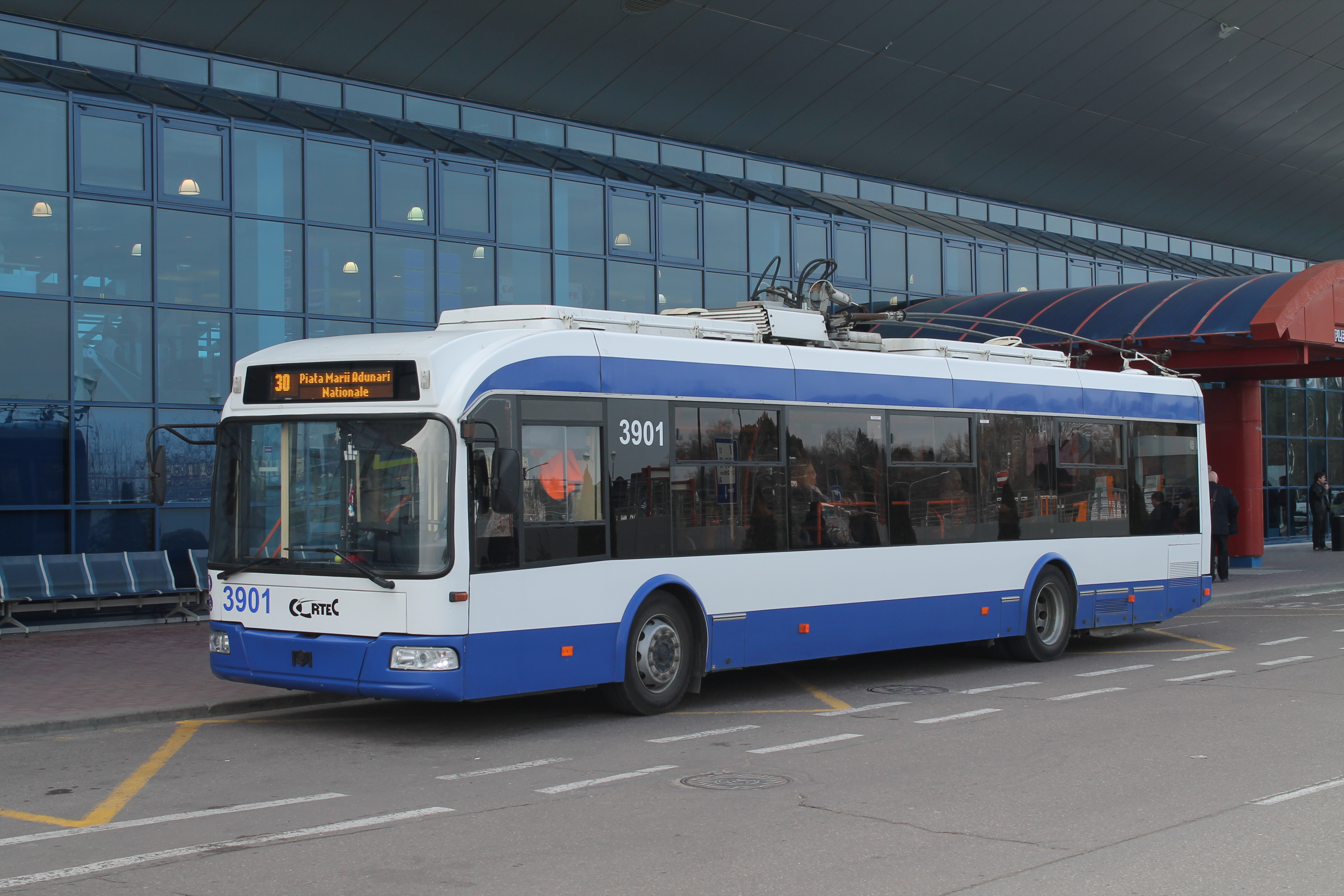
Trolleybus on the street

=== Airport ===
Chișinău Eugen Doga International Airport offers connections to major destinations in Europe and Asia.

FlyOne and HiSky airlines have their headquarters, and Wizz Air has its hub on the grounds of Chișinău Eugen Doga International Airport.

=== Road ===
The most popular form of internal transport in Moldova is generally the bus. Although the city has just three main terminals, buses generally serve as the means of transport between cities in and outside of Moldova. Popular destinations include Tiraspol, Odesa (Ukraine), Iași and Bucharest (Romania).

=== Rail ===
The second most popular form of domestic transportation within Moldova is via railways. The total length of the network managed by Moldovan Railway (as of 2009) is 1,232 kilometres (766 miles). The entire network is single track and is not electrified. The central hub of all railways is Chișinău Railway Station. There is another smaller railway station – Revaca located on the city's ends.

Chișinău Railway Station has an international railway terminal with connections to Bucharest and Kyiv.

=== Public transport ===
==== Trolleybuses ====
There is a wide trolleybus network operating as common public transportation within the city. From 1994, Chișinău saw the establishment of new trolleybus lines, as well as an increase in capacity of existing lines, to improve connections between the urban districts. The network comprises 22 trolleybus lines being 246 km (153 mi) in length. Trolleybuses run between 05:00 and 23:00. There are 320 units operating daily in Chișinău. However, the requirements are as minimum as 600 units. A trolleybus ticket costs 7 lei (ca. $0.41). It is the cheapest method of transport within Chișinău municipality.

==== Buses ====
There are 29 lines of buses within Chișinău municipality. At each public transportation stops there is attached a schedule for buses and trolleybuses. There are approximately 330 public transportation stops within Chișinău municipality. There is a big lack of buses inside city limits, with only 115 buses operating within Chișinău.

==== Minibuses ====
In Chișinău and its suburbs, privately operated minibuses known as "rutieras" generally follow the major bus and trolleybus routes and appear more frequently.

As of October 2017, there are 1,100 units of minibuses operating within Chișinău. Minibuses services are priced the same as buses – 7 lei for a ticket (ca. $0.41).

=== Traffic ===
The city traffic becomes more congested as each year passes. Nowadays there are about 300,000 cars in the city plus 100,000 transit transports coming to the city each day. The number of personal transports is expected to reach 550,000 (without transit) by 2025.

== Sport ==
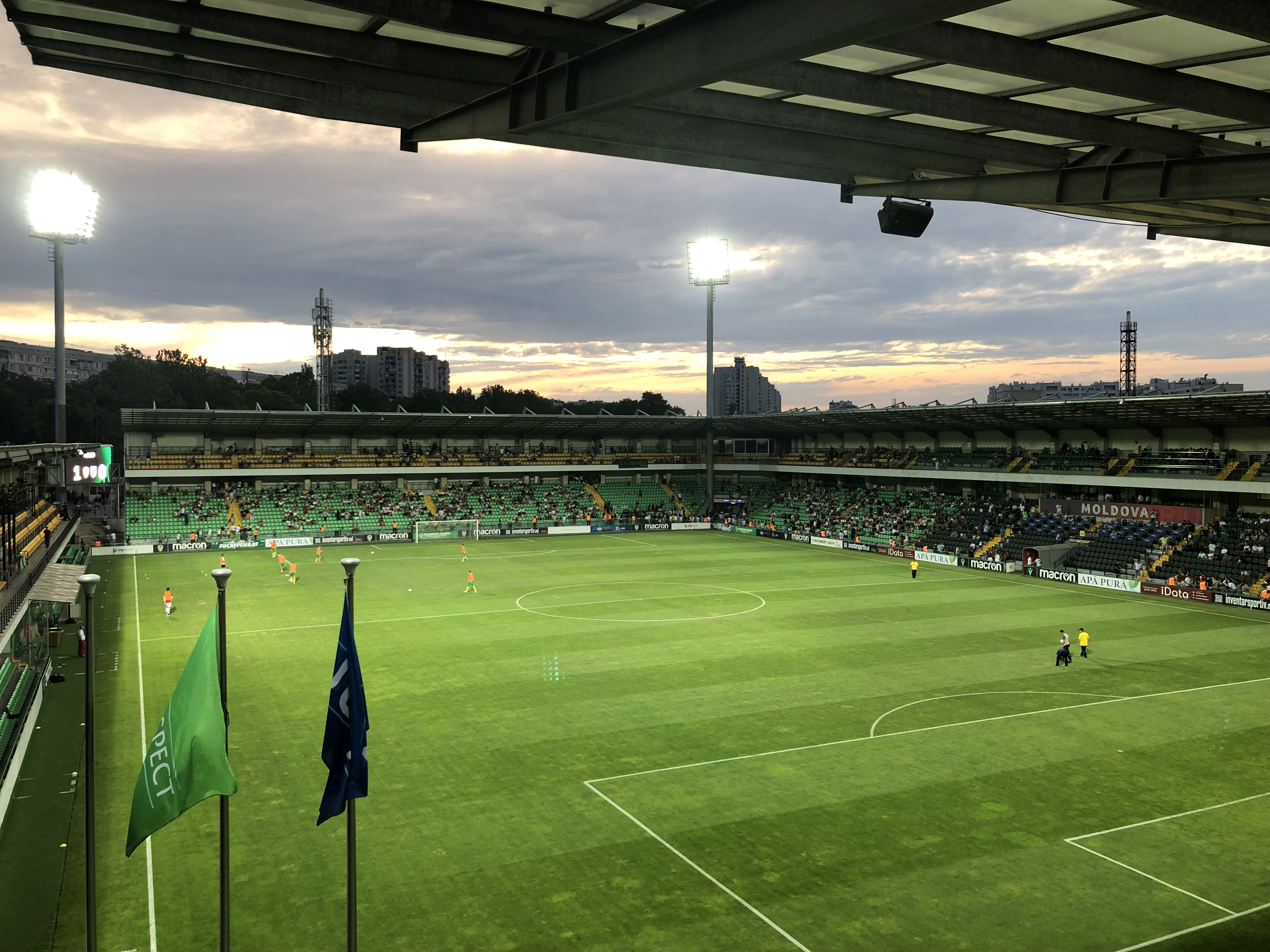
Zimbru Stadium

Football is the most widely followed sport in Chișinău. Local clubs such as Zimbru, Dacia Buiucani, Spartanii Sportul and Politehnica UTM compete in the Moldovan Liga (top tier), while Real Succes and Victoria play in the Liga 1 (second tier).

Zimbru Stadium, which opened in May 2006 with a seating capacity of 10,104, meets all the requirements for hosting official international matches and serves as the home venue for the Moldova national football team.

Since 2011, CS Femina-Sport Chișinău has organized women's competitions in seven sports.

Chișinău Arena, an indoor arena was opened in 2022.

The FMF Beach Soccer Arena, a beach soccer stadium that opened in 2022, was the main venue for the Euro Beach Soccer League and the Socca EuroCup events held in 2022, 2023 and 2024.

The city also hosts the annual Chișinău International Marathon.

== Notable people ==
=== Natives ===
- Gavril Afanasiu, Bessarabian opera singer, lyric baritone and singing teacher
- Radu Albot, Moldovan professional tennis player
- Doina Aldea-Teodorovici, Moldovan-Romanian singer, part of the iconic musical duo that defined the national awakening of the early 1990s
- Nicolae Alexandri, Bessarabian-Romanian politician, editor-in-chief of Cuvânt Moldovenesc
- Abram Anikst, Russian economist and revolutionary, People's Commissar for Labor of the Ukrainian Soviet Socialist Republic and Deputy People's Commissar of Labor of the Russian Socialist Federative Soviet Republic
- Olga Anikst, Russian revolutionary and Soviet educator, organizer of vocational education in the Russian SFSR, and the founder and first rector of the Moscow State Linguistic University
- Olga Bancic, Jewish-Romanian communist activist, known for her role in the French Resistance
- Regina Barzilay, Israeli-American computer scientist and professor at MIT
- Savatie Baștovoi, Moldovan Orthodox monk, novelist, essayist, poet, painter, and theologian
- Dan Bălan, Moldovan musician, singer-songwriter, and record producer, founder of the popular Eurodance band O-Zone
- Alexandru Boldur, Bessarabian-Romanian historian, lawyer, and archeologist
- Marcel Bostan, Moldovan singer and leader of the alternative rock band Alternosfera
- Samuel Bronston, American film producer and media executive (and Leon Trotsky's nephew)
- Elena Cataraga (Lena Scissorhands), Moldovan heavy metal singer and songwriter
- Petru Cazacu, medical doctor, historian, publicist, and Prime Minister of the Moldavian Democratic Republic
- Maria Cebotari, Romanian soprano and actress, one of Europe's greatest opera stars in the 1930s and 1940s
- Toma Ciorbă, Romanian physician and hospital director
- Claudia Cobizev, Moldovan sculptor
- Miron Constantinescu, Marxist sociologist, historian, academic, and journalist, leading member of the Romanian Communist Party
- Alexandru Cristea, priest, choir conductor, music teacher, composer of the music for the national anthem of Moldova
- Ion Cuțelaba, Moldovan light heavyweight UFC fighter
- Nicolae Donici, Romanian astronomer
- Boris Epure, Bessarabian-Romanian politician, member of Sfatul Țării
- William F. Friedman, American cryptologist
- Alexander Frumkin, Soviet electrochemist
- Dennis Gaitsgory, Israeli-American mathematician at MPIM
- Anton Gămurari, Moldovan general, veteran of the Transnistrian War
- Anastasia Golovina, the first Bulgarian female doctor
- Sarah Gorby, French-Jewish singer
- Paul Gore, Romanian politician and historian, honorary member of the Romanian Academy
- Vladimir Herța, mayor of Chișinău in the wake of the Great Union
- Laura Hidalgo, Argentine actress
- Anatole Jakovsky, French art critic
- Boris Katz, American computer scientist at MIT
- Nathaniel Kleitman, American physiologist and sleep researcher
- Lev Kogan-Bernstein, revolutionary and member of Narodnaya Volya
- Patricia Kopatchinskaja, Moldovan-Austrian-Swiss violinist
- Brigitta P. Kovarskaia (1930–1998) physicist, computer scientist, historian
- Avigdor Lieberman, Israeli politician
- Petre Luscalov (1927–2004), writer
- Lia Manoliu, Romanian discus thrower and Olympic medalist
- Viorica Marian, Moldovan-born American psycholinguist, cognitive scientist, and professor of psychology at Northwestern University
- Oleksandr Matsievskyi (1980–2022), Ukrainian soldier
- George Meniuc, Moldovan writer
- Lewis Milestone, American film director, two-time Academy Award winner
- Constantin Mimi, Bessarabian politician and winemaker
- Tatiana Molcean – diplomat and Executive Secretary of the United Nations Economic Commission for Europe (UNECE)
- Sacha Moldovan, American expressionist and post-impressionist painter
- Tatiana Nicolescu, Romanian historian of literature and translator
- Ilya Oleynikov (1947–2012), Russian comic actor and television personality
- Nina Pekerman (born 1977), Israeli triathlete
- Lev Pisarzhevsky (1874–1938), Soviet chemist
- Viktor Pisarzhevsky (1876–1903), lichenologist and notary
- Alexandru Plămădeală (1888–1940), Moldovan sculptor, creator of the Stephen the Great Monument
- Radu Poklitaru (born 1972), Moldovan-born Ukrainian choreographer-director
- Nicu Popescu (born 1981), Moldovan author and diplomat
- Andrei Sârbu (1950–2000), Moldovan painter
- Alexander Schmidt (1879–1954), Bessarabian German politician, economist, lawyer and academic, the last Tsarist mayor of Chișinău
- Alexey Shchusev (1873–1949), Russian and Soviet architect
- Yulia Sister (born 1936), Israeli analytical chemist and science historian
- Serghei Spivac (born 1995), Moldovan heavyweight UFC fighter
- Cleopatra Stratan, Moldovan-Romanian singer, youngest artist to score a No. 1 hit in a country
- Mihai Timofti (1948–2023), Moldovan theatre and film director, actor, multi-instrumentalist musician, professor, screenwriter, writer and composer
- Alexander Ulanovsky (1891–1970), Soviet resident spy in the United States in the 1930s, prisoner in the Soviet Gulag
- Olga Volkenstein (1875–1942), Russian journalist, suffragist and a leader of the women's rights movement in pre-revolutionary Russia
- Maria Winetzkaja (1889–1956), American opera singer in the 1910s-1920s
- Iona Yakir (1896–1937), Red Army commander executed during the Great Purge
- Chaim Yassky (1896–1948), Jewish physician killed in the Hadassah medical convoy massacre
- Pavlo Yelizarov (born 1968), Ukrainian military officer, businessman and television producer
- Sam Zemurray (1877–1961), American businessman who made his fortune in the banana trade
- Olga Vrabie (1902–1928) Moldovan poet
- Valentina Rusu-Ciobanu (1920 – 2021) Moldovan painter
- Valentina Halitov (1926 - 2012) Moldovan physician
- Ana Lupan (1922 – 1998) Moldovan writer

== Twin towns – sister cities ==
Chișinău is twinned with:

- Alba Iulia, Romania (2011)
- Ankara, Turkey (2004)
- Borlänge, Sweden (2009)
- Bucharest, Romania (1999)
- Chernivtsi, Ukraine (2014)
- Grenoble, France (1977)
- Iași, Romania (2008)
- Kyiv, Ukraine (1999)
- Mannheim, Germany (1989)
- Odesa, Ukraine (1994)
- Reggio Emilia, Italy (1989)
- Sacramento, United States (1990)
- Suceava, Romania (2021)
- (Georgia (country)) Tbilisi, Georgia (2011)
- Tel Aviv, Israel (2000)
- Yerevan, Armenia (2000)
- Kingston Upon Hull, England (1982)
