= Tohatin =

- Commune
- Location in Moldova
- Country: Moldova
- Municipalities of Moldova: Chișinău Municipality

Population (2024)
  - Total: 4,045
- Time zone: UTC+2 (EET)
  - Summer (DST): UTC+3 (EEST)
- Area code: +373 22

Tohatin is a commune located 8 kilometers east of Chişinău, Moldova on the road leading to Vadul lui Vodă. The commune is composed of three villages: Buneți, Cheltuitori and Tohatin.

Tohatin is similar to other small Moldovan villages, with less than 200 dwellings. Because of its proximity to Chișinău, it has become a bedroom community.
