= CS Femina-Sport Chișinău =

Moldovan sports society

- Full name: Clubul Sportiv Femina-Sport Chișinău
- Founded: 5 October 2011, Mihai Burciu
- Based in: Chișinău
- Colors
- Owner: Mihai Burciu
- President: Mihai Burciu
- Website: http://www.femina-sport.net/

CS Femina-Sport Chișinău is a Moldovan sports society in Chișinău, Moldova. The club was founded in 2011, and is the only exclusively female sports club in this region. At the moment in club activates 7 sections: football, basketball, handball, volleyball, rugby league, tennis and bowling. In November 2012 the club was close to being dissolved due to financial problems.

== Honours ==
Basketball

- Moldovan championship (2): 2011-2012, 2012-2013
- Moldovan Cup (2): 2011, 2012, 2013

Handball

- Moldovan championship

Runners-up (2): 2011-2012, 2012-2013, 2013-2014

- Winter Moldovan Cup (1): 2011-2012
- Moldovan Cup

Runners-up (1): 2012

Rugby

- „Liga Prutului”

Winners (1): 2012

Beach Volleyball

- Moldovan championship

Runners-up (1): 2012

- Championship of Chișinău

Runners-up (1): 2012

- „Victoria” Cup

Winners (1): 2013

Volleyball 2x2

- Moldovan championship

Third place (1): 2012

- Moldovan Cup (1): 2012
