= DTV (Moldovan TV channel) =

Moldovan television station

- Country: Moldova

Links
- Website: www.dtv.md

DTV was a television station in Moldova.

== History ==
In February 2007, DTV broadcast from 08:00 to 12:00 with all of its programming being produced by the channel. It had repeatedly asked local cable operator Sun TV since December 2005 to carry the channel, which was also echoed in its website, but Sun TV rejected. On March 27, 2007, the channel's reporters were detained and its video footage wiped.

DTV resumed satellite broadcasts on Ascension Day 2008. At the same time, the channel aired programs promoting basic journalist principles and condemning corruption.
