= Church of the Transfiguration (disambiguation) =

Church of the Transfiguration or Holy Transfiguration Church may refer to any of the following:

== Albania ==
- Holy Transfiguration Church, Gjirokastër
- Church of the Holy Transfiguration, Herebel, Dibër County
- St. Sotir Church, Korçë, also known as the Transfiguration Church

== Belarus ==
- Transfiguration Church, Navahrudak, Grodno Region (Roman Catholic)
- Transfiguration Church, Polotsk, Vitebsk Region

== Croatia ==
- Church of the Transfiguration of the Lord, Trpinja, Vukovar-Srijem County (Serbian Orthodox)

== Estonia ==
- The Obinitsa Church of Transfiguration of Our Lord, Meremäe Parish

== Hungary ==
- Transfiguration Church, Szentendre, Pest County (Serbian Orthodox)

== Lithuania ==
- Holy Transfiguration Church, Kėdainiai, Kaunas County

== Italy ==
- Trasfigurazione di Nostro Signore Gesù Cristo, Rome

== Israel ==
- Catholic Church of the Transfiguration on Mount Tabor
- Orthodox Church of the Transfiguration on Mount Tabor

== Malta ==
- Church of the Transfiguration, Qrendi

== Moldova ==
- Transfiguration Church, Chișinău

== Palestine ==
- Church of Transfiguration, Ramallah

== Philippines ==
- The church of the Monastery of the Transfiguration, Bukidnon

== Romania ==
- Transfiguration Church, Hunedoara

== Russia ==
- Church of the Transfiguration on Ilyina Street, Veliky Novgorod, Novgorod Oblast
- Church of the Transfiguration in Kizhi, Republic of Karelia, a World Heritage Site
- Transfiguration Church in Kovalyovo, Novgorod Oblast
- Transfiguration Church, Krasnoyarsk (Roman Catholic)
- Transfiguration Church, Pyatigorsk, Stavropol Krai (Roman Catholic)
- Church of the Transfiguration (Obukhovka), Rostov Oblast
- Church of the Transfiguration (Olkhovchik), Rostov Oblast
- Church of the Transfiguration (Spassky), Tula Oblast
- Transfiguration Church, Starocherkasskaya, Rostov Oblast
- Transfiguration of the Lord Church, Tver
- Church of the Transfiguration (Zaymo-Obryv), Rostov Oblast

== Serbia ==
- Church of the Holy Transfiguration, Sarajevo
- Church of the Transfiguration, Krivaja, Šabac

== Singapore ==
- Church of The Transfiguration, Singapore

== Turkmenistan ==
- Chapel of the Transfiguration, Ashgabat (Roman Catholic)

== Ukraine ==
- Church of Transfiguration, Lviv

== United Kingdom ==
- Church of the Transfiguration, Pyecombe, West Sussex

== United States ==
Alaska

- Holy Transfiguration of Our Lord Chapel in Ninilchik
- Transfiguration of Our Lord Chapel in Nushagak

Arkansas

California

- Church of the Transfiguration in San Jose (Roman Catholic)

Connecticut

- Church of the Transfiguration in Norfolk (Episcopal)

Illinois

- Church of the Transfiguration in Palos Park (Episcopal)
- Church of the Transfiguration in Wauconda (Roman Catholic)

Maryland

Massachusetts

- Church of the Transfiguration in Orleans (Ecumenical; Roman-style basilica)

Minnesota

- Episcopal Church of the Transfiguration (Belle Plaine, Minnesota)

New Hampshire

- Church of the Transfiguration in Derry, New Hampshire (Episcopal)

New Jersey

- Church of the Transfiguration in Collingswood (Roman Catholic)

New York

- Church of the Transfiguration, Episcopal (Manhattan), also known as the Little Church Around the Corner, the first church to be named for the Transfiguration in the United States
- Church of the Transfiguration, Roman Catholic (Manhattan) on Mott Street in Chinatown, Manhattan (originally Zion Episcopal Protestant Church; now Roman Catholic)
- Church of the Transfiguration in Tarrytown (Roman Catholic)
- Church of the Transfiguration in Buffalo (Roman Catholic; closed in 1993)
- Church of the Transfiguration in Maspeth (Roman Catholic)
- Church of the Holy Transfiguration of Christ-on-the-Mount in Woodstock
- Church of the Transfiguration (Blue Mountain Lake, New York)
- Russian Orthodox Cathedral of the Transfiguration of Our Lord in Brooklyn

North Carolina

- Church of the Transfiguration (Saluda, North Carolina)

Ohio

- Transfiguration Church (Cleveland, Ohio) (Roman Catholic)

Pennsylvania

- Church of the Transfiguration in Blue Ridge Summit (Episcopal)
- Transfiguration Church in West Hazleton (Roman Catholic)

Texas

- Church of the Transfiguration in Dallas (Episcopal)

Washington

- Church of Transfiguration in Tacoma (Russian Evangelical Baptist)

Wyoming

- Chapel of the Transfiguration in Grand Teton National Park, near Jackson (Episcopal)

== See also ==
- Transfiguration Cathedral (disambiguation)
