= Episcopal Church of the Transfiguration =

Episcopal Church of the Transfiguration may refer to:

in the United States

(by state)

- Episcopal Church of the Transfiguration (Arcadia, California)
- Episcopal Church of the Transfiguration (Vail, Colorado)
- Episcopal Church of the Transfiguration (Belle Plaine, Minnesota)
- Episcopal Church of the Transfiguration (Dallas, Texas)

== See also ==
- Church of the Transfiguration (disambiguation)
