= Transfiguration Church, Pyatigorsk =

Coordinates: 44.3714°N 43.0764°E

Transfiguration Church
- Храм Преображения Господня
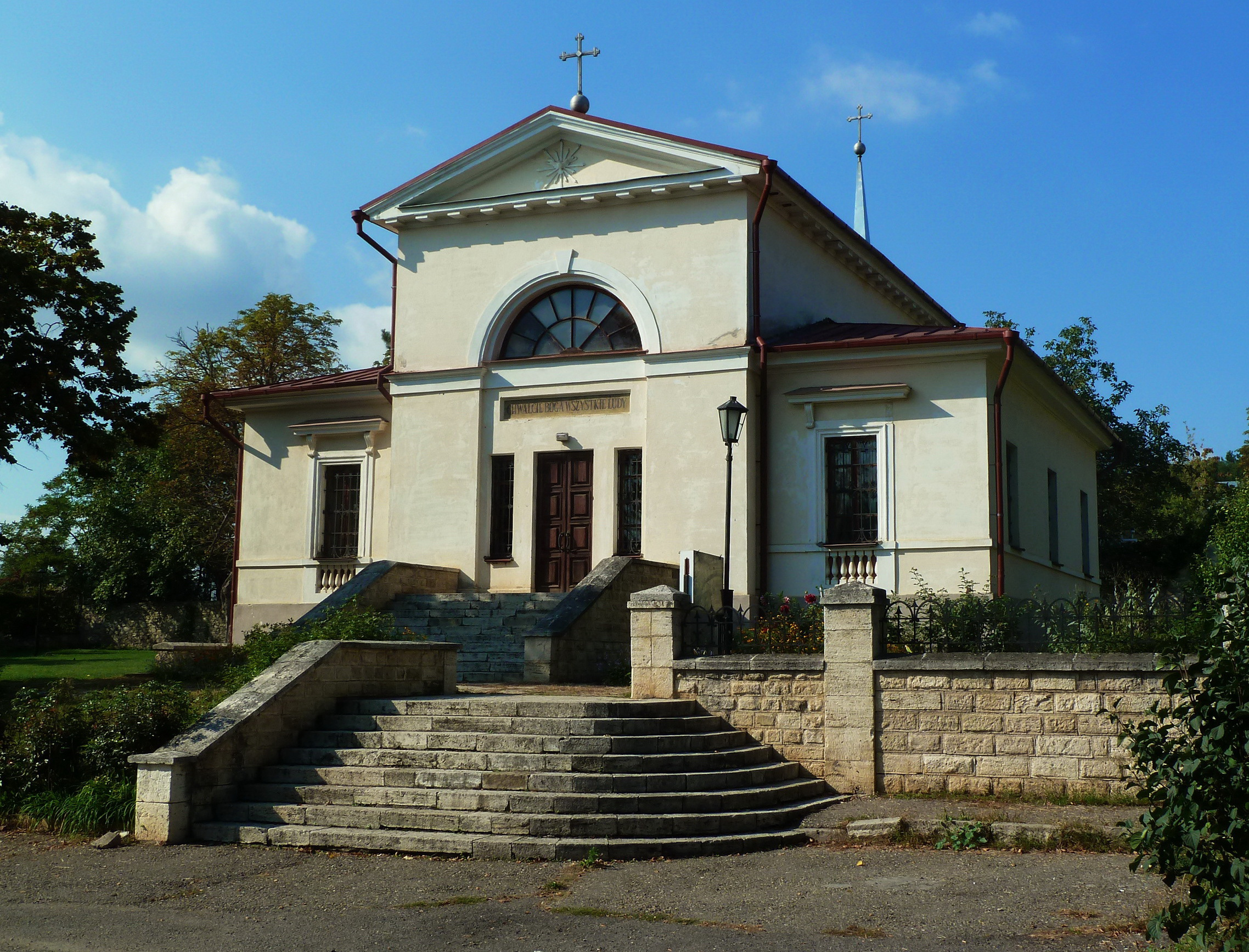
- Transfiguration Church
- Location: Pyatigorsk
- Country: Russia
- Denomination: Roman Catholic Church

The Transfiguration Church (Russian: Храм Преображения Господня) Is a Catholic church in the city of Pyatigorsk (Stavropol Krai) in southern Russia, built in the 1840s. it depends on the Diocese of Saratov and is in Anisimov street.

The church is built in the neoclassical style, and is registered in the list of cultural heritage.

== History ==
Pyatigorsk had a few thousand Roman Catholics in the 1830s, mainly Polish exiles in the city after the Polish uprising of 1830. The Emperor Nicholas in 1837 granted permission to build a church for Catholics in the city. After raising money, the church was built from 1840 to 1844 according to designs by Giuseppe and Giovanni Battista, members of a famous dynasty of architects, authors of many architectural monuments in the Caucasus. Others taking part in the construction work included the Bernardazzi brothers, and Samuel Upton, of English origin.

The dedication ceremony of the Church of the Transfiguration was held on August 6, 1844. After the 1917 revolution, the Bolshevik government suppressed all religions. Religious services continued until 1937 despite the repression. However, in January 1938, at the height of Stalinist repression, the priest Johann Roth was shot and the church was closed.

After the fall of communism the church was registered again in 1992. The building was returned fully to the Catholic Church in 2005; previously it served as both a concert hall and a Catholic church.

== See also ==
- Roman Catholicism in Russia
- Transfiguration Church

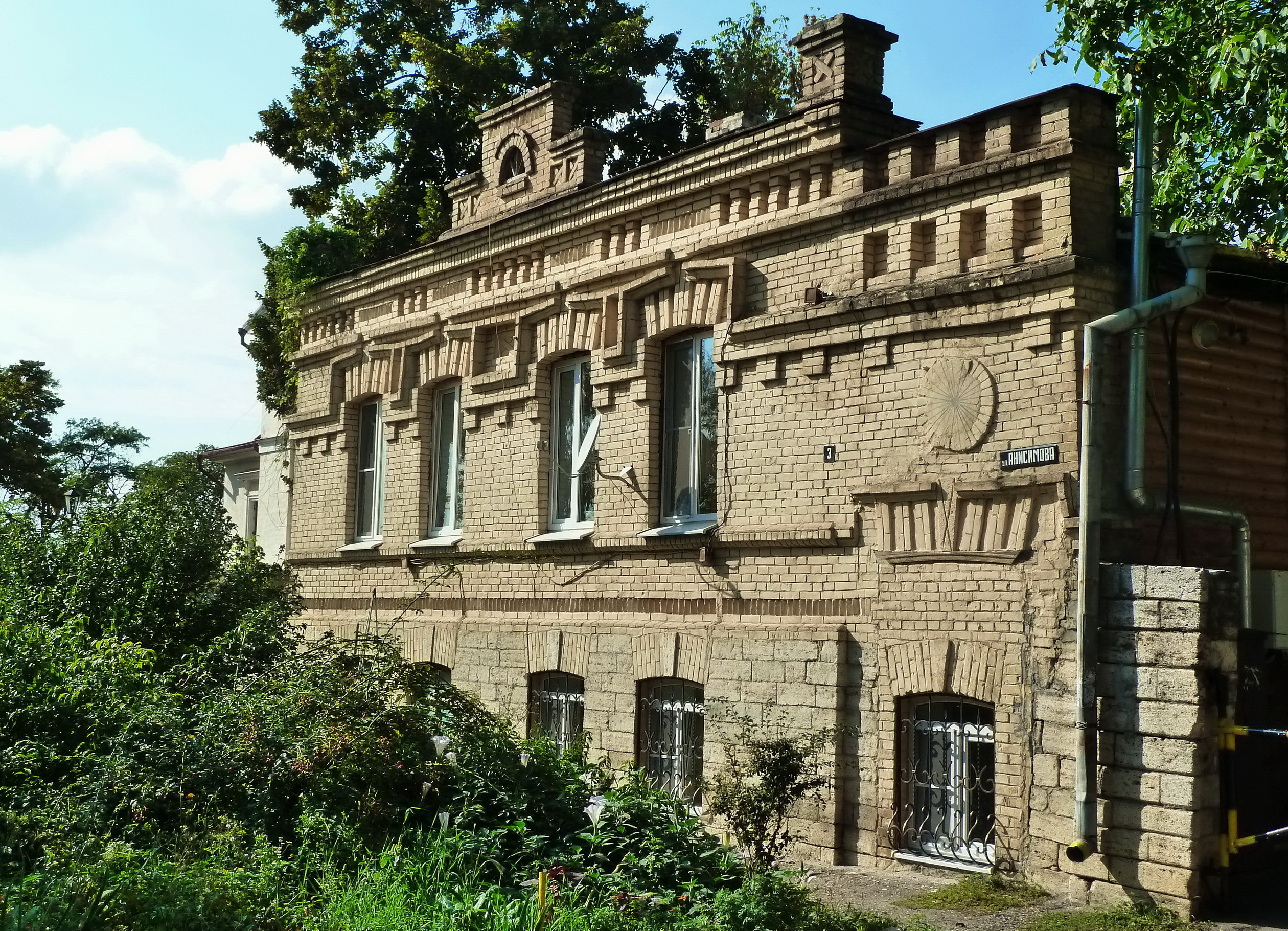
Another view
