= Vishera (Novgorod Oblast) =

Vishera Russian: Вишера
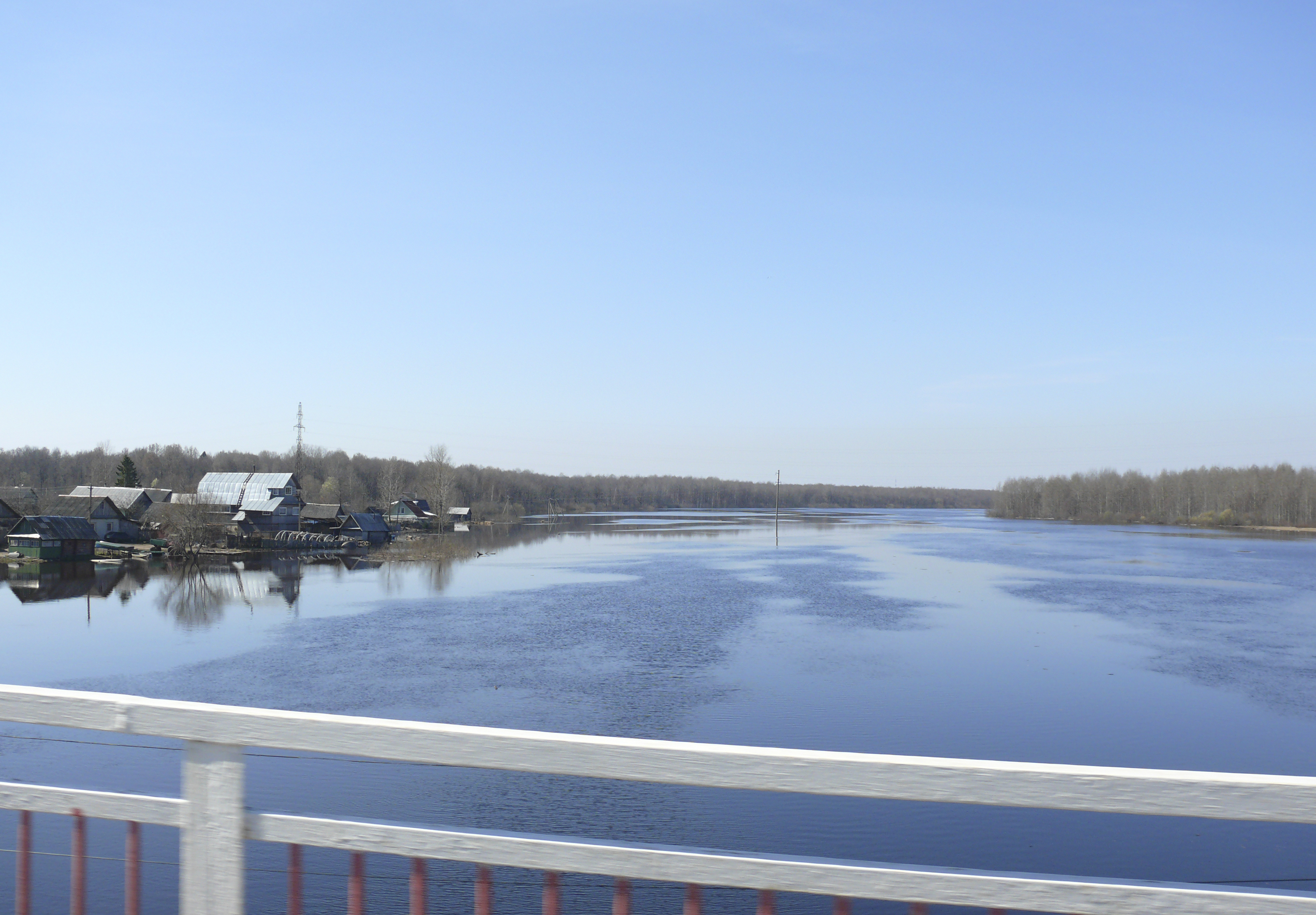
- The Vishera in the village of Savino

Location
- Country: Russia

Physical characteristics
- Mouth: Maly Volkhovets
  - coordinates: 58°33′44″N 31°24′14″E
- Length: 64 km (40 mi)
- Basin size: 1,100 km^{2} (420 sq mi)

Basin features
- Progression: Maly Volkhovets→ Volkhov→ Lake Ladoga→ Neva→ Gulf of Finland

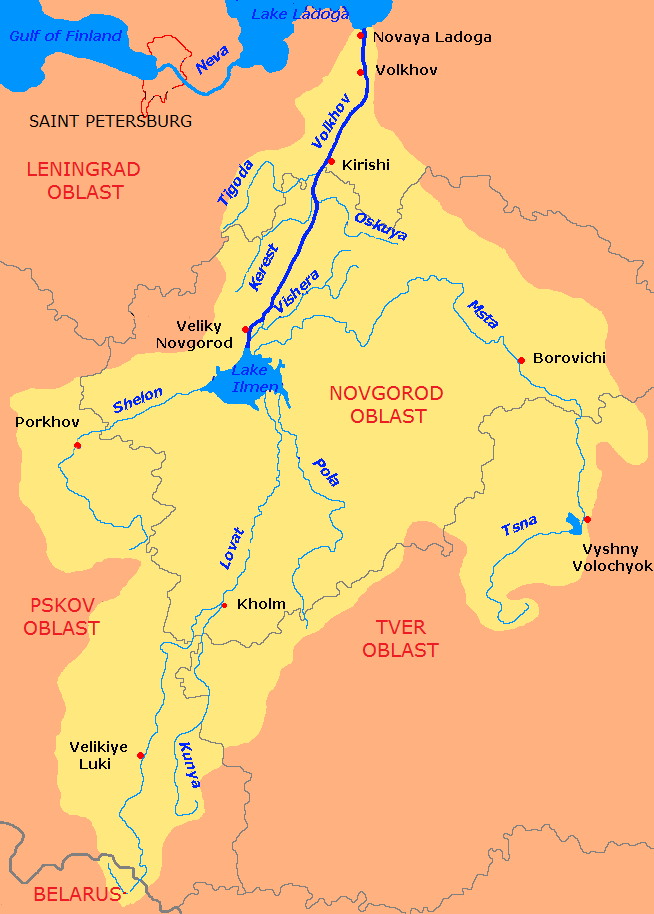
The Volkhov River drainage vasin. The Vishera is shown on the map.

The Vishera (Russian: Вишера) is a river in Malovishersky and Novgorodsky Districts, Novgorod Oblast, Russia, a right tributary of the Maly Volkhovets, an eastern armlet of the Volkhov. It is 64 kilometres (40 mi) long, and drains a basin of 1,100 square kilometres (420 sq mi).

The Vishera river originates from the confluence of the Malaya Vishera (left) and the Bolshaya Vishera (right) several kilometers southwest of the town of Malaya Vishera, close to the border of Malovishersky and Novgorodsky Districts. From the confluence, the Vishera flows southwest and enters Novgorodsky District. Its mouth is located approximately 10 kilometres (6.2 mi) east of the city of Veliky Novgorod.
