= Transfiguration Church in Kovalyovo =

- Церковь Спаса на Ковалёве
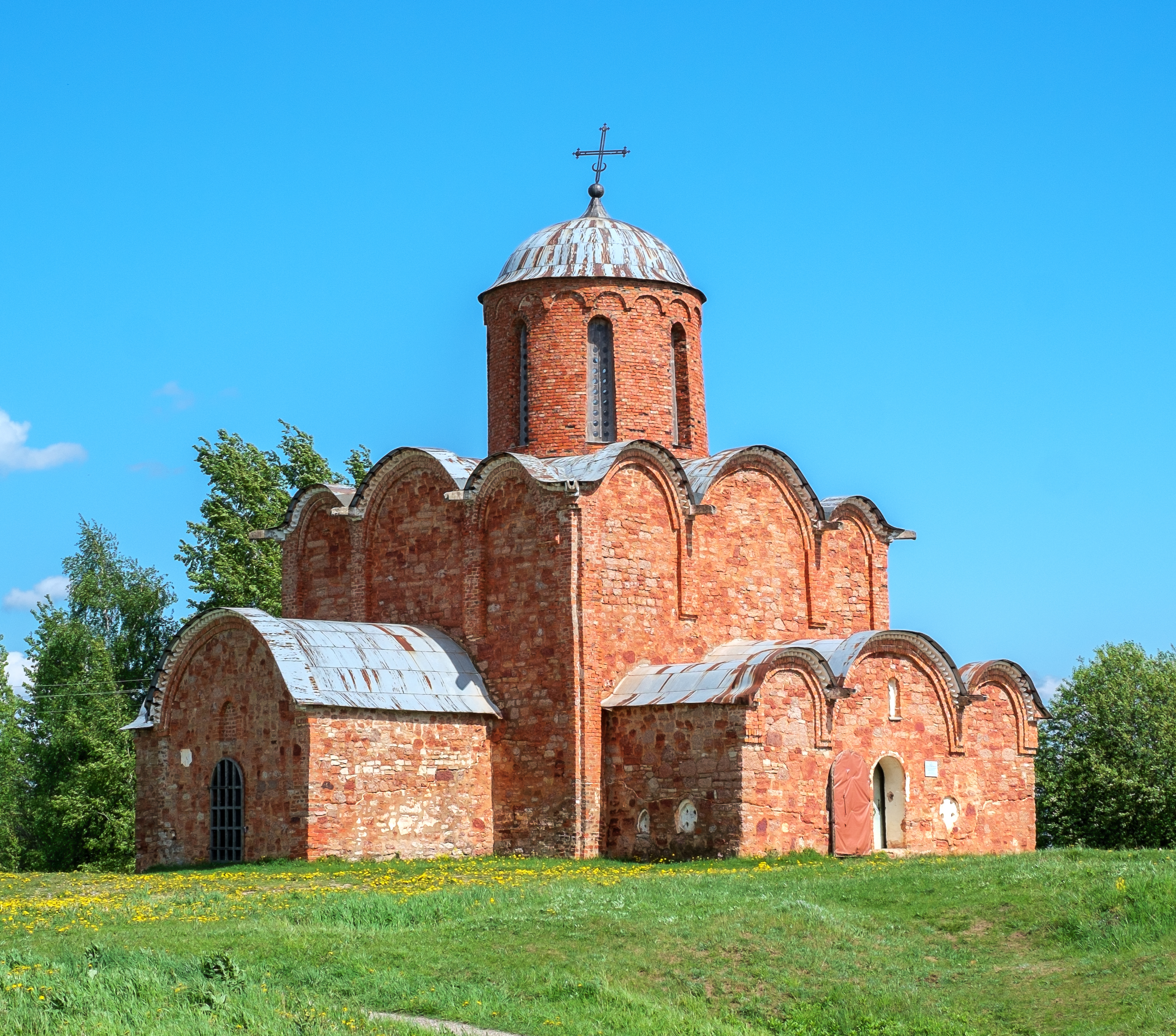
- Transfiguration Church in Kovalyovo
- 58°31′31.5″N 31°21′33.5″E
- Location: Close to Veliky Novgorod
- Country: Russia
- Denomination: Russian Orthodox

Architecture
- Style: Russian
- Completed: 1345

The Transfiguration Church in Kovalyovo (Russian: Церковь Спаса на Ковалёве, Tserkov Spasa na Kovalyove) in Novgorodsky District, Novgorod Oblast, Russia, was built around 1345. The church was notable for the frescoes created in the 14th century. The church was destroyed to the ground during World War II and restored in 1970. Fragments of the frescoes have since been reconstructed. The church is located 4 kilometres (2.5 mi) east of Veliky Novgorod, on the right bank of the Maly Volkhovets River. The Transfiguration Church in Kovalyovo was designated an architectural monument of federal significance (#5310100000).

== History ==
The church was built as the katholikon of the small Kovalyovo Monastery. It was commissioned around 1345 by a boyar named Ontsifor Zhabin. The southern annex is thought to have been designed as the burial vault of the Zhabin family. The frescoes were painted ca. 1380.

During the Second World War, between 1941 and 1943, the church was destroyed. After the war, the ruins were conserved. In the 1960s, fragments of the frescoes were restored. Only 16 square metres (170 ft^{2}) originally survived, but the restorers (led by Alexander Grekov and Valentina Grekova) managed to retrieve about 160 square metres (1,700 ft^{2}) of frescoes from the debris. In 1970, the church was rebuilt to a design by Leonid Krasnorechyev.

== Architecture ==
The church is constructed in brick, and has one dome. It has a single apse and four square columns. This design is typical for pre-Mongol Novgorod churches. There are two auxiliary chapels of different size flanking the main building from the south and from the north. The south chapel has a set of limestone crosses inserted in the walls. The system of vault roofing features three semicircular wall gables (zakomara) which hark back to the pre-Mongol period. The pillars are square rather than circular or octagonal, as was typical for the 14th century.

== Frescoes ==
The frescoes, created ca. 1380, covered the apse, the inner surface of the dome, the southern and the northern walls of the church, some of the pillars, and the interior of the western chapel. They were sponsored by Afanasy Stepanovich and his wife. The frescoes are thought to have been painted by a team of Balkan (possibly Serbian) painters. Their static and hieratic style has little in common with other Novgorodian frescoes of the period; but it shares similarities with the older Byzantine tradition. The total area of the frescoes was 450 square metres (4,800 ft^{2}).

The interior of the dome was filled with images of the prophets. But it is the images of warrior saints that predominate. This is usually explained by the fact that in the 1370s the Grand Duchy of Moscow, with the support of other Russian states, was preparing to fight against the Golden Horde, culminating in 1380 with the Battle of Kulikovo. There is also the first Russian image of the dead Jesus Christ in the tomb.

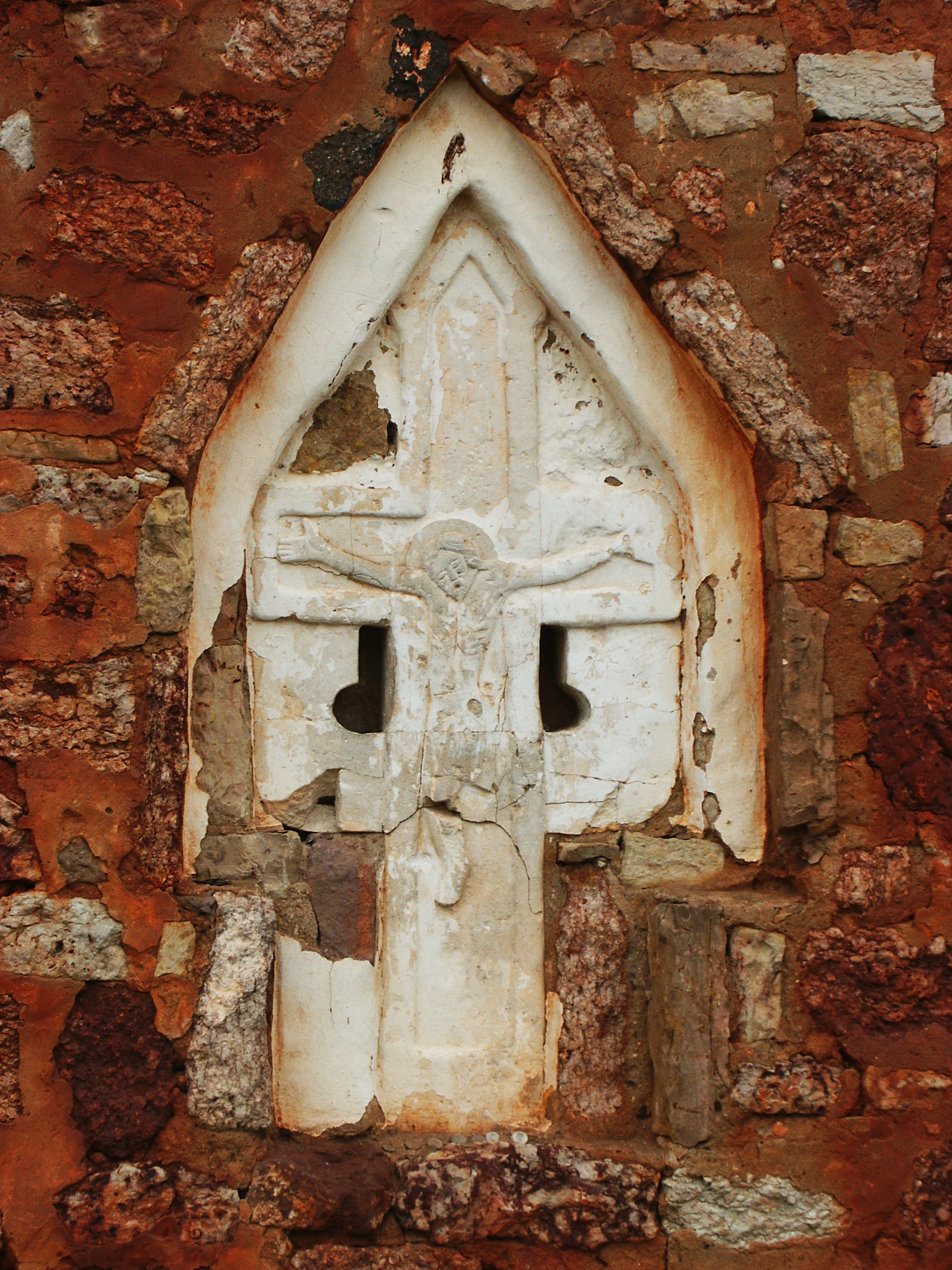
A limestone cross inserted in the wall

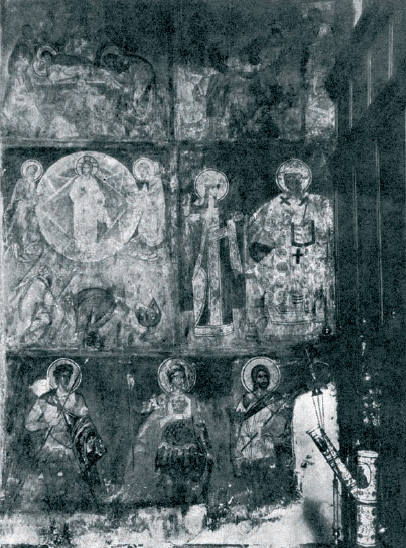
The frescoes of the north wall

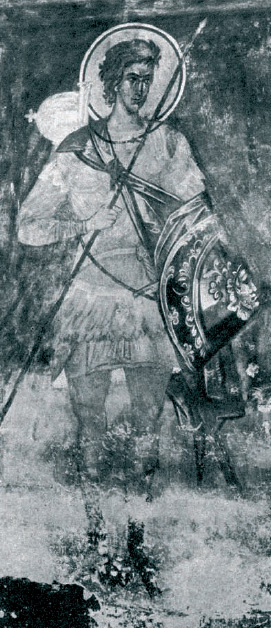
Unnamed Holy Warrior (believed to be St. Mercurius/Abu-Seifein)

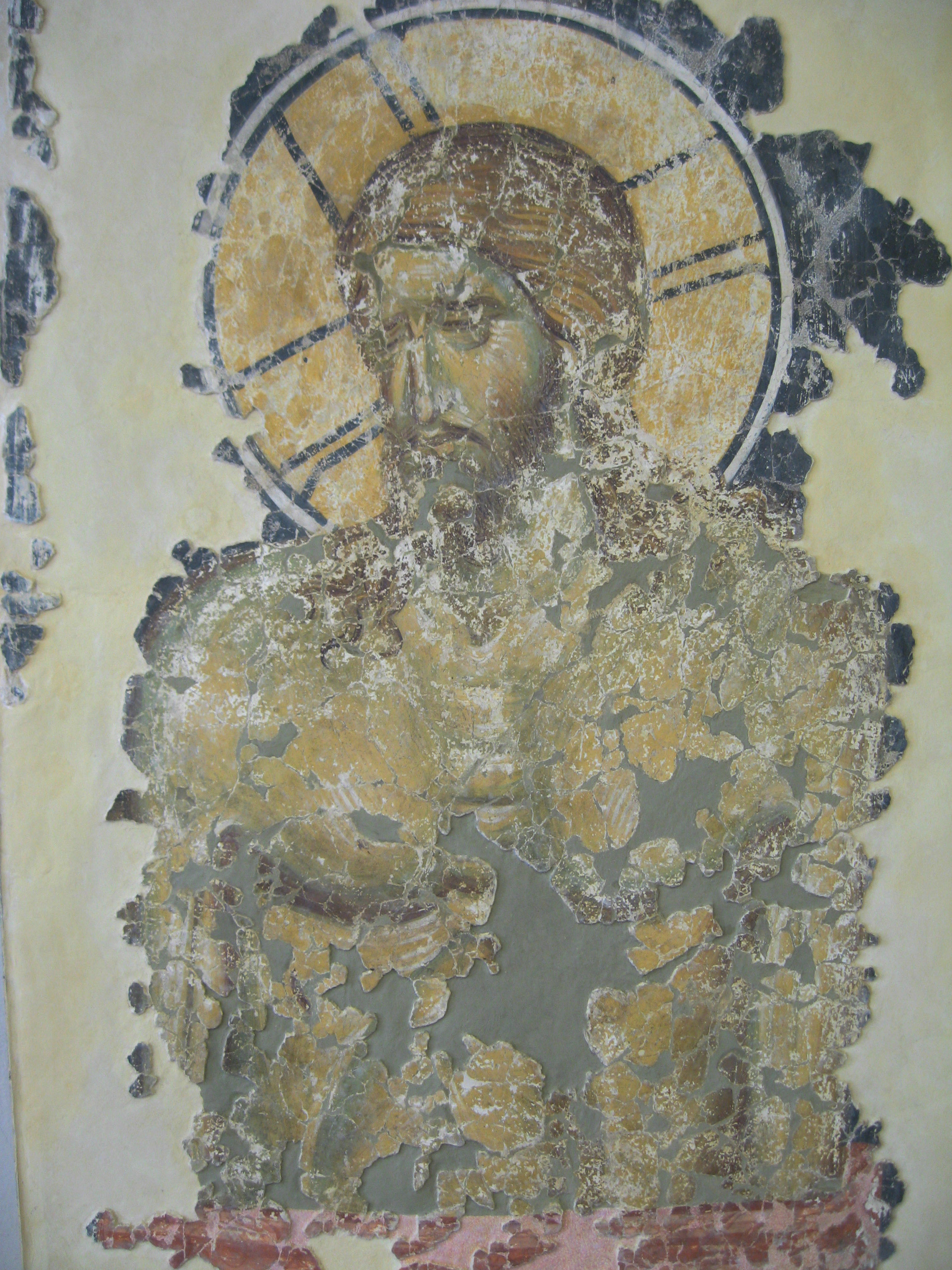
The remaining fragments of the fresco depicting Jesus in the tomb.
