= Manly N. Cutter =

American architect (1851–1931)

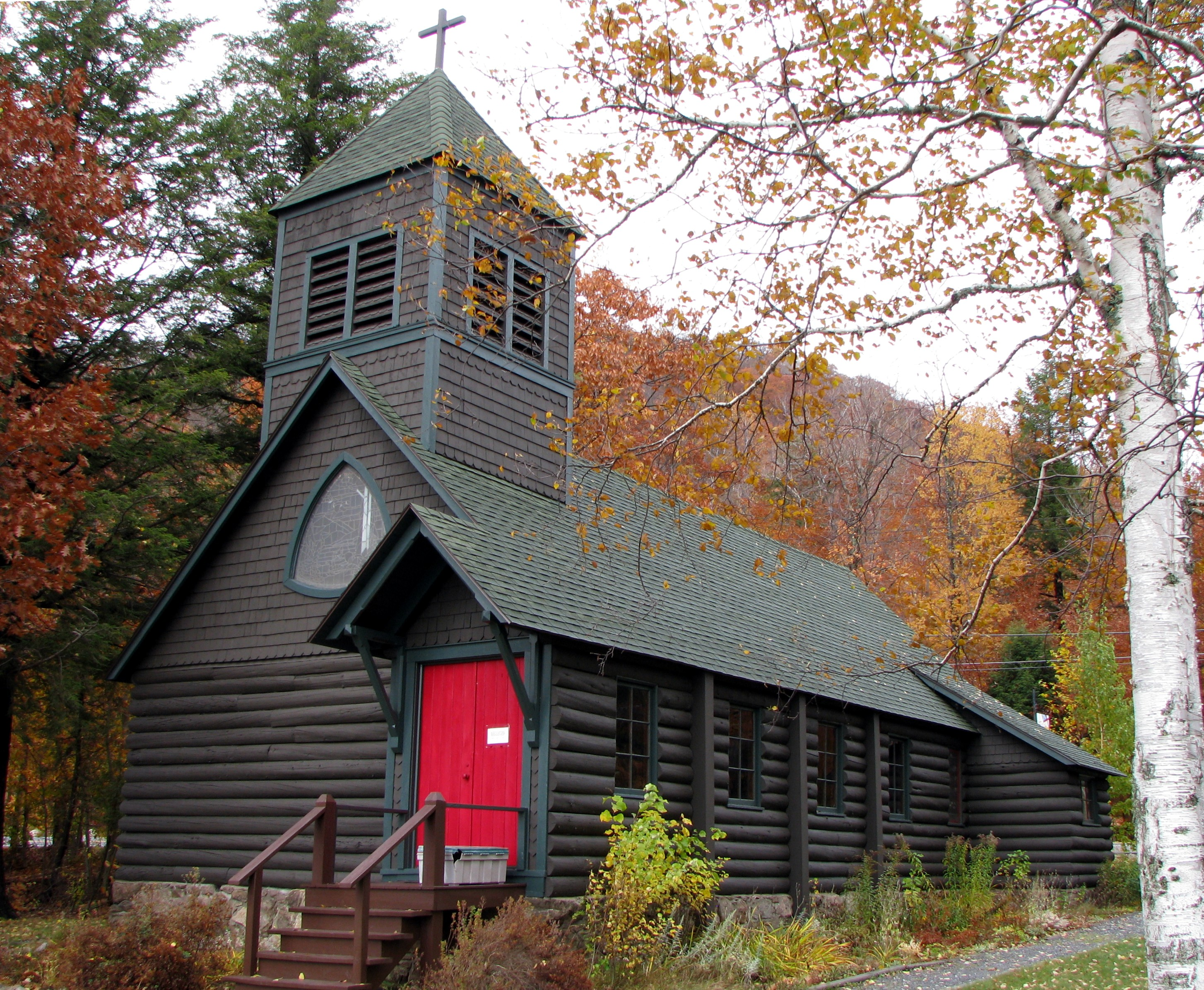
Church of the Transfiguration (Blue Mountain Lake, New York)

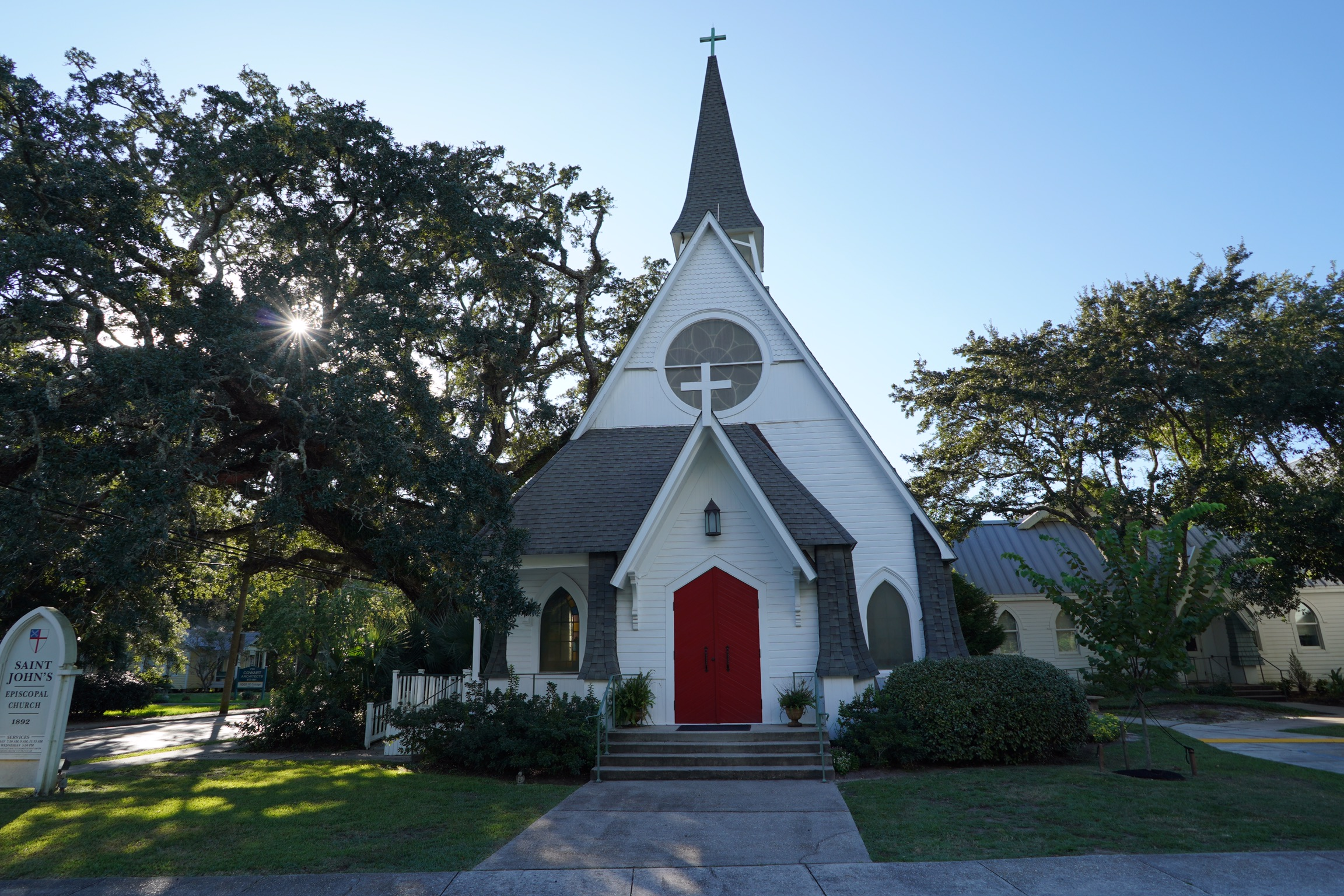
Saint John's Episcopal Church (Ocean Springs, Mississippi)

Manly N. Cutter (1851 - 1931) was an architect and interior designer associated with work in New Jersey, Boston, New York City, the state of New York, and Alberta, Canada. He is credited with the design of the National Register of Historic Places listed Saint John's Episcopal Church (Ocean Springs, Mississippi) and Church of the Transfiguration (Blue Mountain Lake, New York). He also designed the picturesque Gothic architecture St. Patrick's Roman Catholic Church on Broadway in New York City and a church in Medicine Hat (1913–14) in Alberta, Canada (interiors were later completed in 1932).

== Career ==
Cutter was a staff architect for the New York Building Plan Company from 1886 to 1892, designing plans for Colonial architecture and Shingle architecture homes. He authored their pattern book entitled The New York Building Plan Co. Illustrated Catalogue of Examples of Buildings in 1887. His residential designs in the Shingle Style were published in the Inland Architect (Chicago) in 1893 and 1894. By 1909 Cutter had left New York and opened an office in New Jersey.

With Alex R. Esty, he produced an unexecuted Victorian Gothic architecture design for the Library of Congress. His work appears in The Architectural Sketch Book during the 1870s as a delineator for Esty and others and as an architect. He moved to New York to work for Leopold Eidlitz and others. He designed a Japanese style room in the house of K. G. Marquand on Madison Avenue and 60th Street in New York city. also credited as an Anglo Japanese style room for Henry G. Marquand. His office seems to have been at 160 Broadway in New York City. He authored a plan for fireproofing structures at low cost that came in for criticism.

He died in Hawthorne, New York on April 4, 1931.

The Church of the Transfiguration is made of spruce logs and was the area's first church. It is a small, one-story, gable-roofed building with a cross like plan on a high fieldstone foundation with a central belfry at the west end. It was listed on the National Register of Historic Places in 1977.

== Work ==
- Saint John's Episcopal Church (Ocean Springs, Mississippi) (1892) on the NW corner of Rayburn and Porter Avenue "based on the design of the Church of the Ascension in Rockville Center, Long Island, New York, by Manly N. Cutter, a New York architect, which was published in The Churchman (July 11, 1891) The plans were prepared by the Rev. Nelson Ayers"
- Church of the Transfiguration (Blue Mountain Lake, New York), a late 19th-century log church described by the New York Times as "a rustic-looking log building at Blue Mountain Lake, designed by New York architect Manly N. Cutter and built by Thomas Wallace in 1885". It was photographed by Barry Lobdell.
- St. John's Church Oneida, New York
- Mott Haven engine company and firehouse (proposed), a three-story $24,000 firehouse at 898 (later re-numbered 618) East 138th Street near Cypress Avenue in 1899 by architect Manly N. Cutter, Deputy Building Superintendent of the Fire Department, but it was not built.
- Fireplace in House of H. L. Einstein, Esq. at 44 West 53rd St. New York City
- Residence for W. Wilson in New York City (plan)
- Designs for Chancel Furniture, St. John's in the Wilderness, Pennsylvania
- Ernest Werner Residence plans (Including floor plans) Pompton, New Jersey
- C.N. Montayne residence plans Atlantic Highlands, New Jersey (Published in the Inland Architect and News Record)
- Catholic Institution Medicine Hat, Alberta, Canada

== Bibliography ==
- Two Years Work in an Architect's Office: Suburban A.L. Chatterton & Company, 1894 - Architecture, Domestic - 204 pages
