= Saint John's Episcopal Church (Ocean Springs, Mississippi) =

Historic church in Mississippi, United States

- U.S. National Register of Historic Places
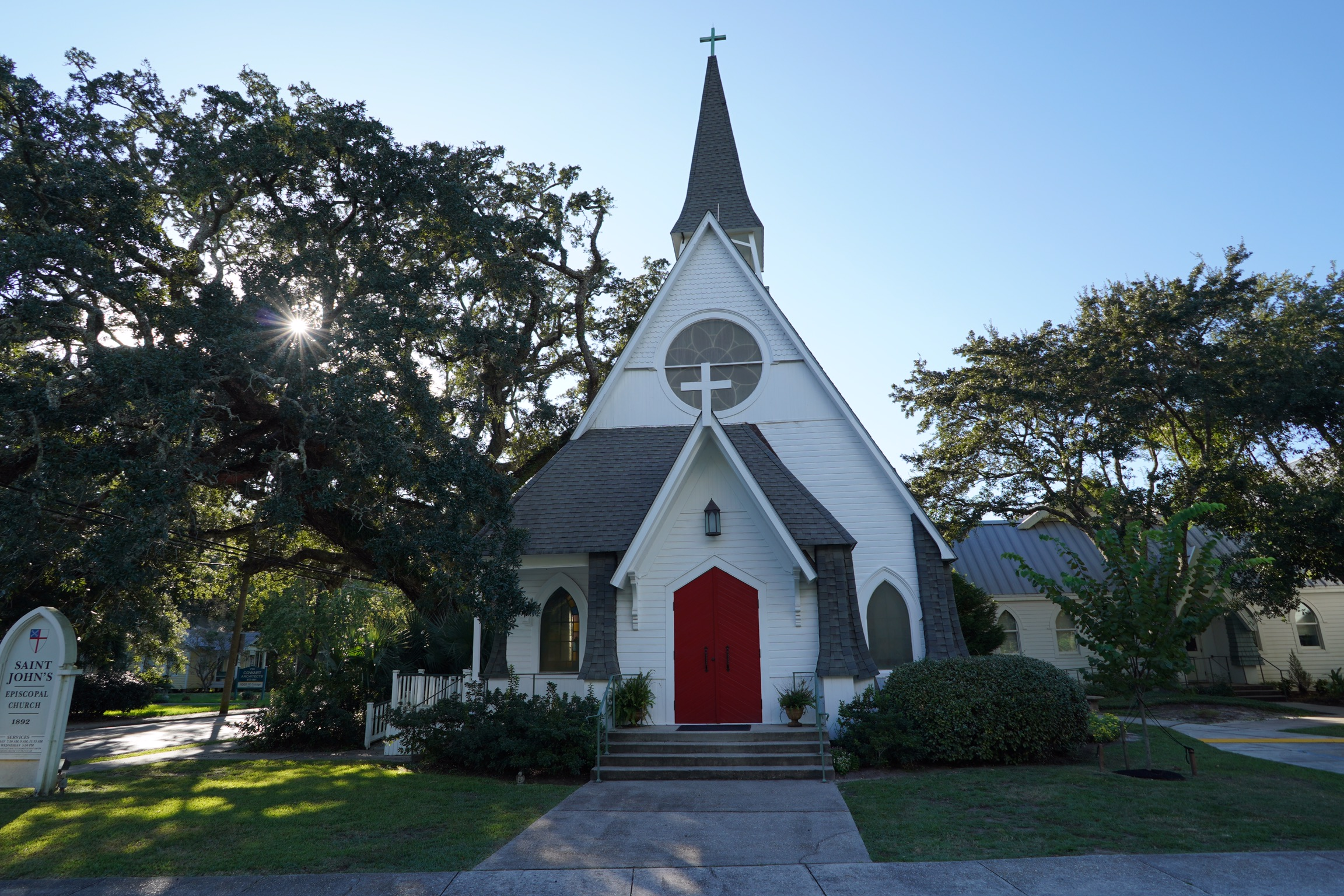
- St. John's Episcopal Church in 2018

- Location within Mississippi Location within the United States
- Location: Northwest corner of Rayburn and Porter Avenues, Ocean Springs, Mississippi
- Coordinates: 30°24′41″N 88°49′53″W
- Area: less than one acre
- Built: 1892
- Architect: Manly N. Cutter
- Architectural style: Gothic, Queen Anne, Shingle Style
- MPS: Ocean Springs MRA
- NRHP reference No.: 87000588
- Added to NRHP: April 20, 1987

Saint John's Episcopal Church is a historic church at the northwest corner of Rayburn and Porter Avenue in Ocean Springs, Mississippi.

It was built in 1892. New York architect Manly N. Cutter is credited with its design. It was added to the National Register in 1987.
