= Maly Volkhovets =

River in Novgorod Oblast, Russia

Coordinates: 58°35′46″N 31°24′52″E

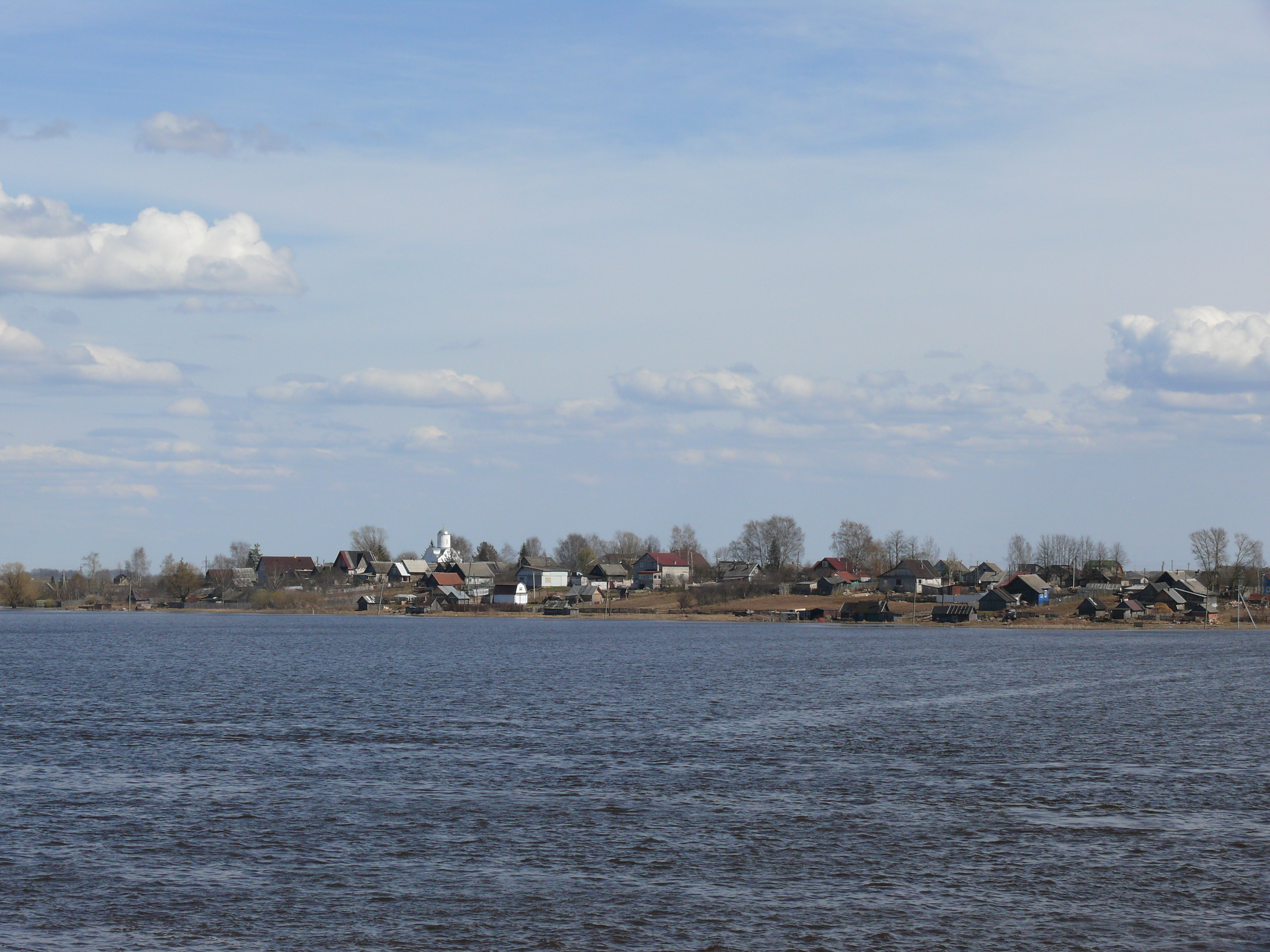
The village of Volotovo, a few miles east of Veliky Novgorod, seen from across the Maly Volkhovets

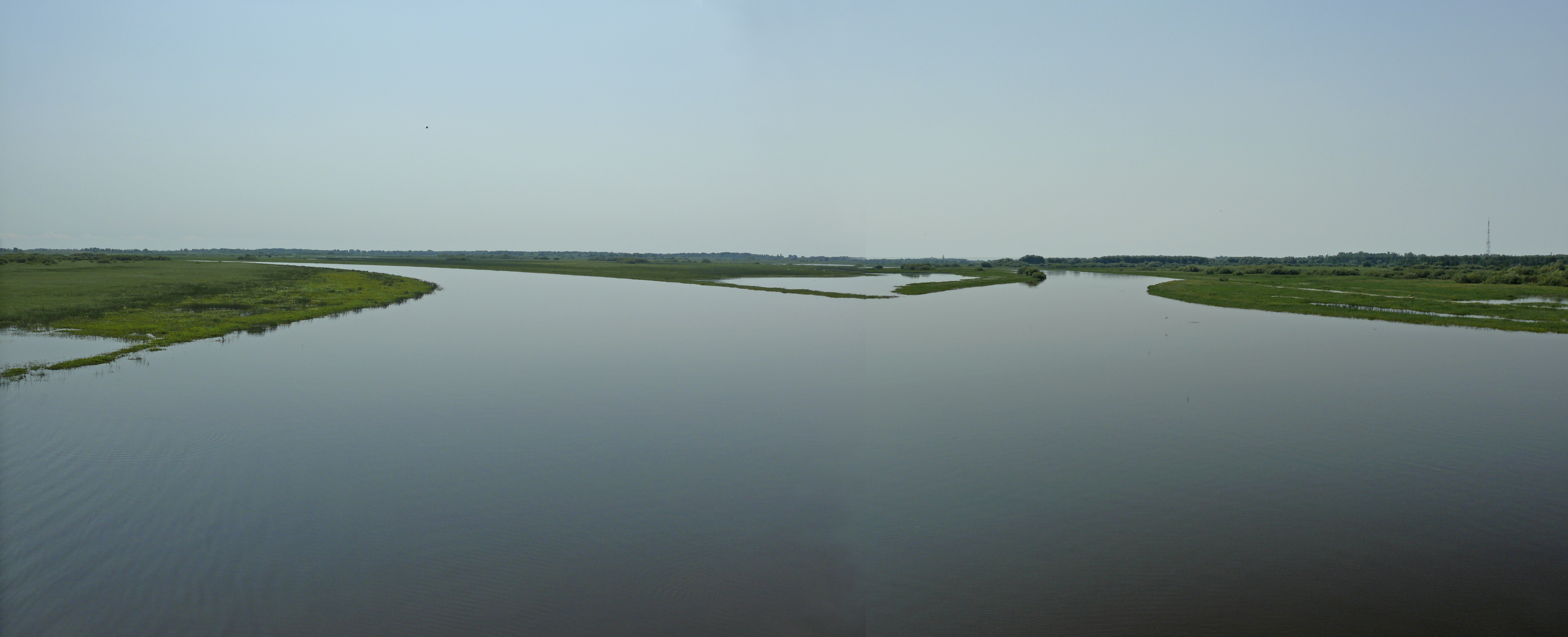
A view of the Maly Volkhovets from the Siny bridge

The Maly Volkhovets (Russian: Малый Волховец) is a right (eastern) armlet of the Volkhov in Novgorodsky District of Novgorod Oblast in Russia. It splits from the Volkhov 2 kilometres (1.2 mi) below its outflow from the Lake Ilmen, bypasses the city of Veliky Novgorod (so that the eastern part of the city is situated on an island), and rejoins the Volkhov north of the Khutyn Monastery. It is 17 kilometres (11 mi) long. The Vishera, one of the Volkhov's principal tributaries, is a tributary of the Maly Volkhovets.

The name of the armlet, which means "The Minor Volkhov", originates from the name of the Volkhov River.

The village of Volotovo with the Assumption Church in Volotovo is located on the right bank of the Maly Volkhovets.
