= Holy Transfiguration Church, Gjirokastër =

Orthodox church in Gjirokastër, Albania

Holy Transfiguration Church
- Kisha e Shpërfytyrimit (Albanian)
- Location within Albania
- 40.0758°N 20.1436°E
- Location: Gjirokastër

History
- Built: 1784; 242 years ago

Cultural Monument of Albania

Holy Transfiguration Church (Albanian: Kisha e Shpërfytyrimit), also known as Church of Gjirokastër is an Orthodox church in Gjirokastër, Albania. The church was built in 1784. It is a Cultural Monument of Albania since 1963.

== See also ==
- Albanian Orthodox Church
