= Transfiguration Church, Hunedoara =

Heritage site in Hunedoara County, Romania

Coordinates: 45°44′50″N 22°53′47″E

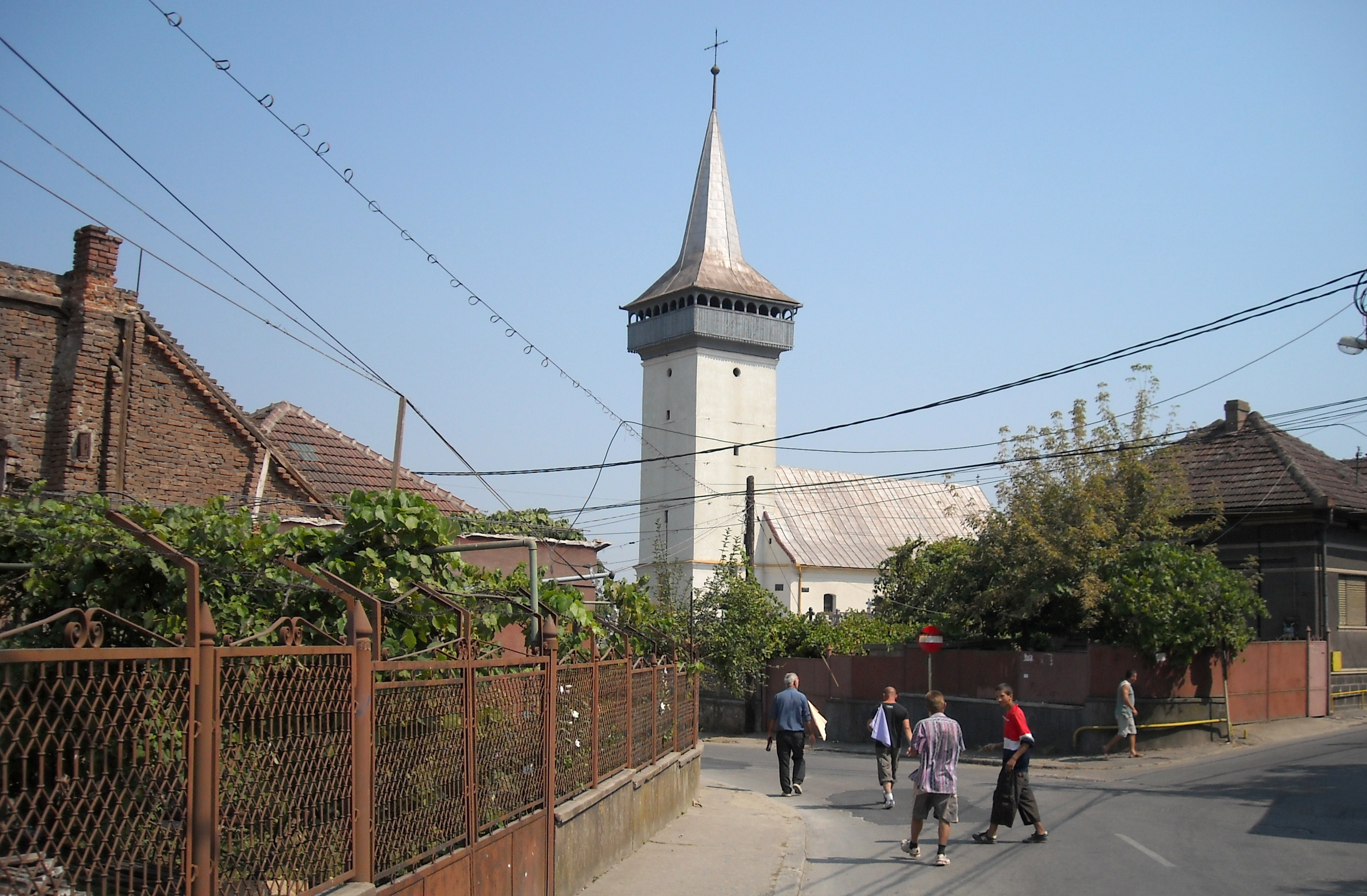
Transfiguration Church

The Transfiguration Church (Romanian: Biserica Schimbarea la Față) is a Romanian Orthodox church located at 35 Popa Șapcă Street, Hunedoara, Romania. It is dedicated to the Feast of the Transfiguration.

The town’s old Orthodox church was taken over by the newly established Romanian Greek-Catholic Church after 1701. The remaining Orthodox community built a small wooden church, which it used for nearly a century. The present church was built between 1797 and 1801, out of donations from local Orthodox believers. The style is Transylvanian, in the shape of a ship, made of brick and stone. The original wood shingle roof was replaced by zinc sheeting in 1958-1959.

Various repairs have been carried out over time, the tower and nave requiring iron support due to large cracks appearing. The church acquired new woodwork and icons in 1925; the interior was painted three years later. The church ran a school until 1918. The large bell was donated in 1926; it cracked and was re-cast in 1952. The church is listed as a historic monument by Romania's Ministry of Culture and Religious Affairs.
