= Church of the Transfiguration, Krivaja =

Church in Mačva District, Serbia

Church of the Transfiguration (Krivaja)
- Црква Преображења у Криваји код Шапца
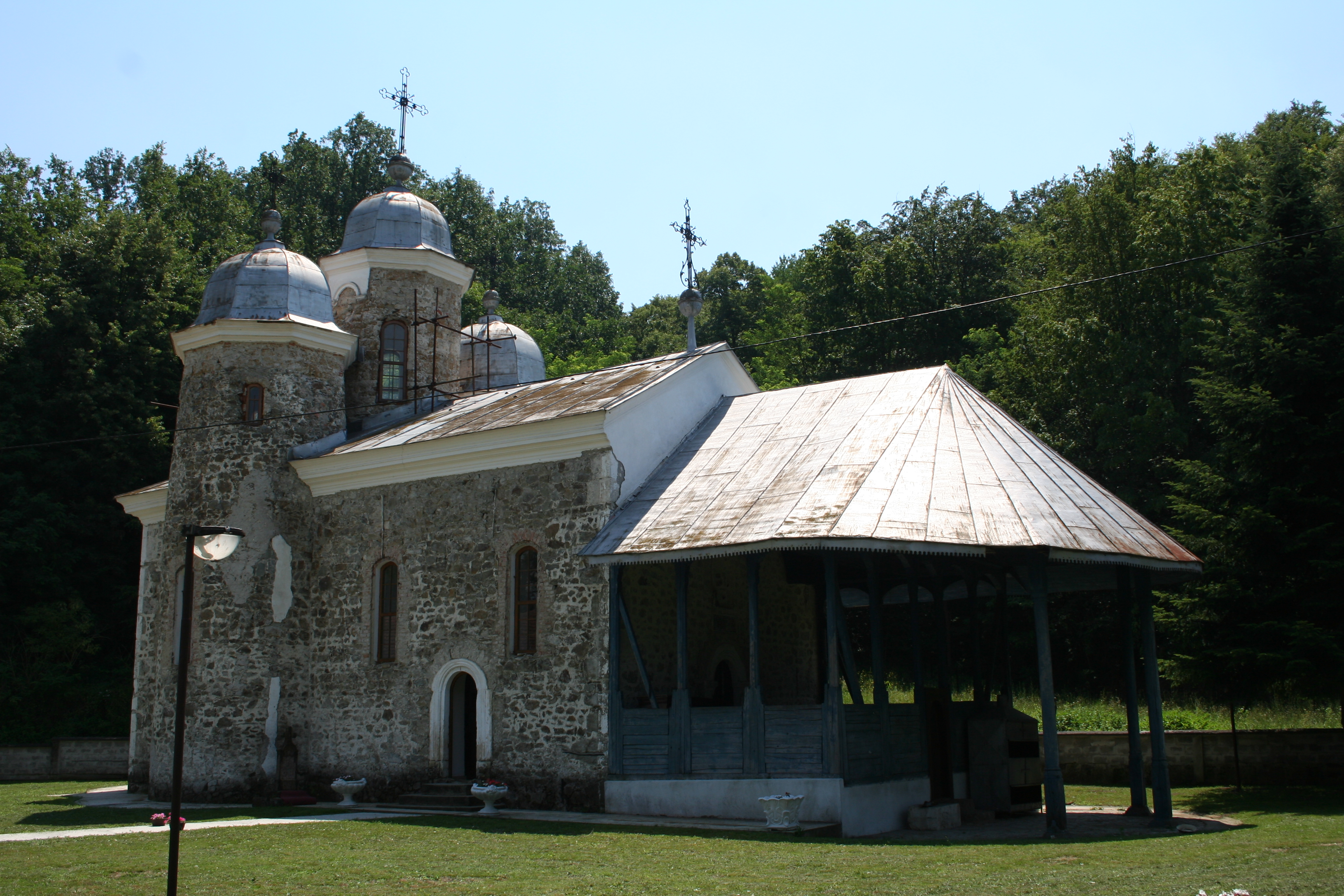

- Location within Serbia

Religion
- Affiliation: Serbian Orthodox Church

Location
- Location: Krivaja, Serbia
- Interactive map of Church of the Transfiguration (Krivaja)

Architecture
- Completed: 1790

Church of the Transfiguration (Krivaja) is the Serbian Orthodox Church, located in Krivaja, near Šabac, and built in 1790. The church is on the list of Cultural Monuments of Great Importance.

At the beginning of the 18th century, the Church of the Transfiguration in the village of Krivaja, belonged to the Krivaja monastery, known as Krivojnik and Dobrinje in history records from the 16th century. Its present look dates back to 1790, when extensive work was performed thanks to the patronage of the noble people from that region. The one who stood out was the Duke Ranko Lazarević.
