= Church of the Transfiguration (Zaymo-Obryv) =

Church in Rostov Oblast, Russia

Coordinates: 47.0120°N 39.1812°E

The Church of the Transfiguration of the Savior
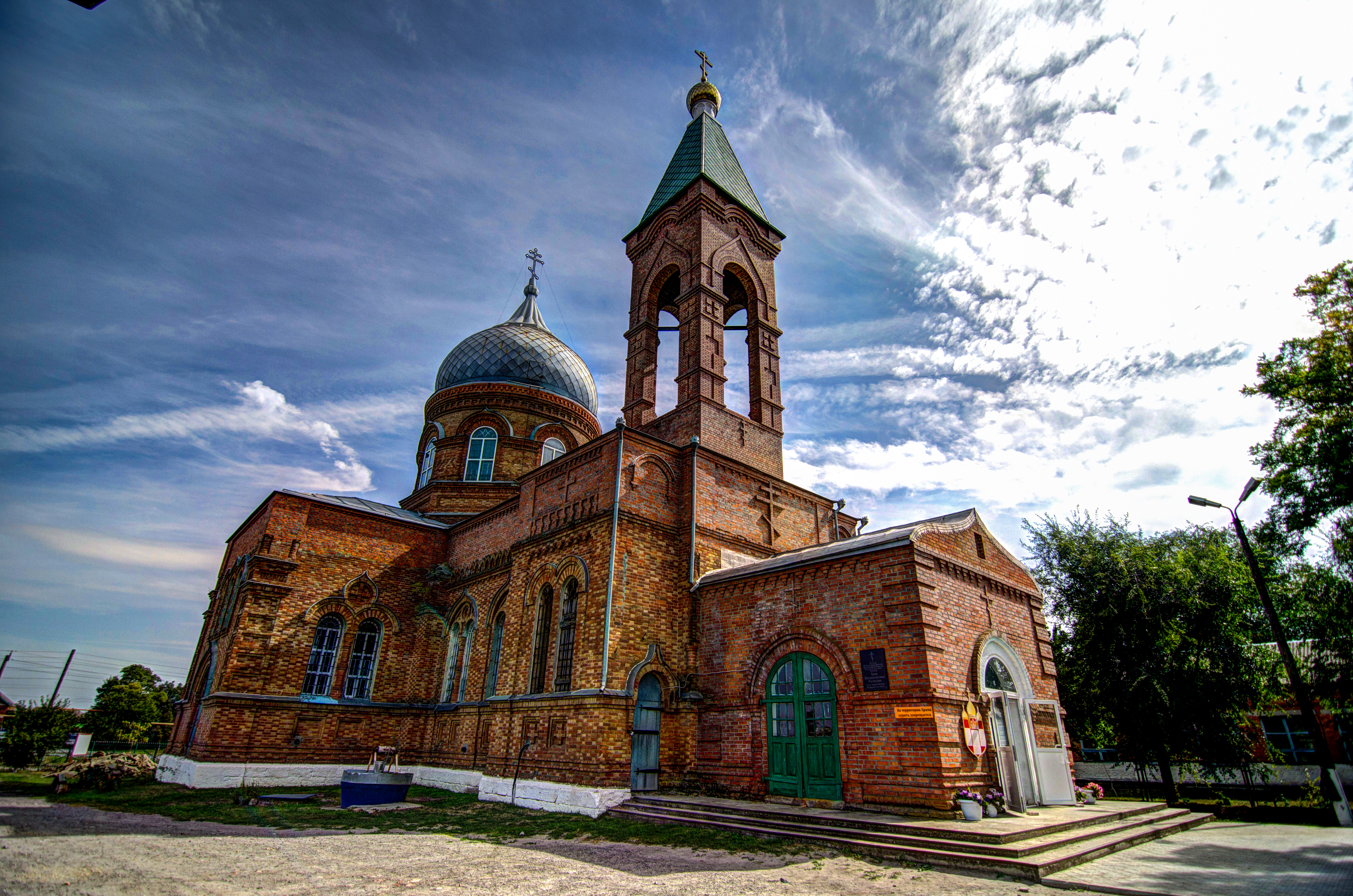

Religion
- Affiliation: Russian Orthodox

Location
- Location: Zaymo-Obryv, Azovsky District, Rostov Oblast, Russia
- Interactive map of The Church of the Transfiguration of the Savior

Architecture
- Architect: P. S. Studenikin
- Style: Neo-Byzantine style
- Completed: 1910

The Church of the Transfiguration of the Savior (Russian: Церковь Спаса Преображения) is a Russian Orthodox church in the village of Zaymo-Obryv, Azovsky District, Rostov Oblast, Russia. It belongs to the Diocese of Rostov and Novocherkassk of Moscow Patriarchate and was built in 1910. It is also an object of cultural heritage of Russia.

== History ==
The Church of the Transfiguration of the Savior in Zaimo-Obryv was completed in 1910 (according to other sources, in 1909) on the project of the Don architect P. S. Studenikin in neo-Byzantine style. The church reached 35.5 meters in height (with the cross on the dome) and 21 meters in width. In the first years after its erection, it vas visited by about three thousand parishioners.

During the Soviet era, the church building was partially destroyed (with the bell tower was being also damaged), and the untouched part was used as a granary store.

The church began to be renovated in 1989. The belltower was rebuilt anew, the area in front of the church was paved with sidewalk tiles, and the walls were newly plastered and painted. A refectory was built and a Sunday School was opened.

In 1992, the church was officially recognized as an object of cultural heritage of the Russian Federation.

Since 2014, a work to restore the interior decoration of the church is underway.
