= Transfiguration Church, Krasnoyarsk =

Coordinates: 56.0075°N 92.8475°E

Transfiguration Church
- Храм Преображения Господня
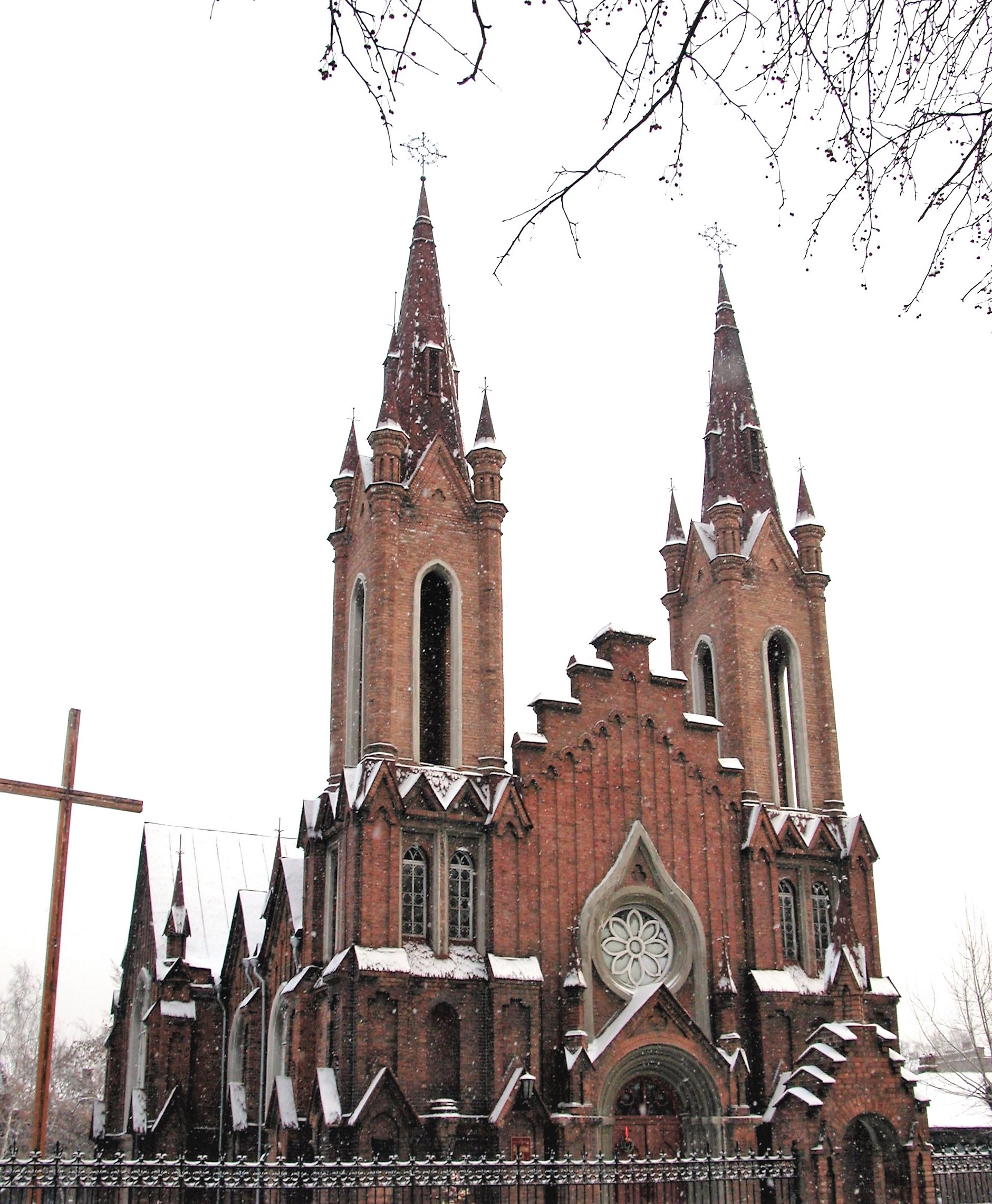
- Transfiguration Church
- Location: Krasnoyarsk
- Country: Russia
- Denomination: Roman Catholic Church

The Transfiguration Church (Russian: Храм Преображения Господня) It is a Catholic church built in neo-Gothic style located in the city of Krasnoyarsk, Russia. It depends on the Diocese of Irkutsk and is located on the street 20 of the Decembrists.

The Catholic parish of Krasnoyarsk, which includes mostly Polish exiles, was officially established on August 1, 1836, and then depends on the Archdiocese of Mogilev and St. Petersburg. The consistory Imperial Tomsk gave permission to this parish to build a new church in 1855, in the Street of the Annunciation, which was ready in 1857. It was made of wood and neo-Gothic style, with stucco decorations and inside walls white. It has a kind of organ "Melodikon". A new structure was built between 1908 and 1910.

== See also ==
- Roman Catholicism in Russia
- Transfiguration of Jesus
