= Transfiguration Church, Chișinău =

Coordinates: 47.0298°N 28.8254°E

Transfiguration Church
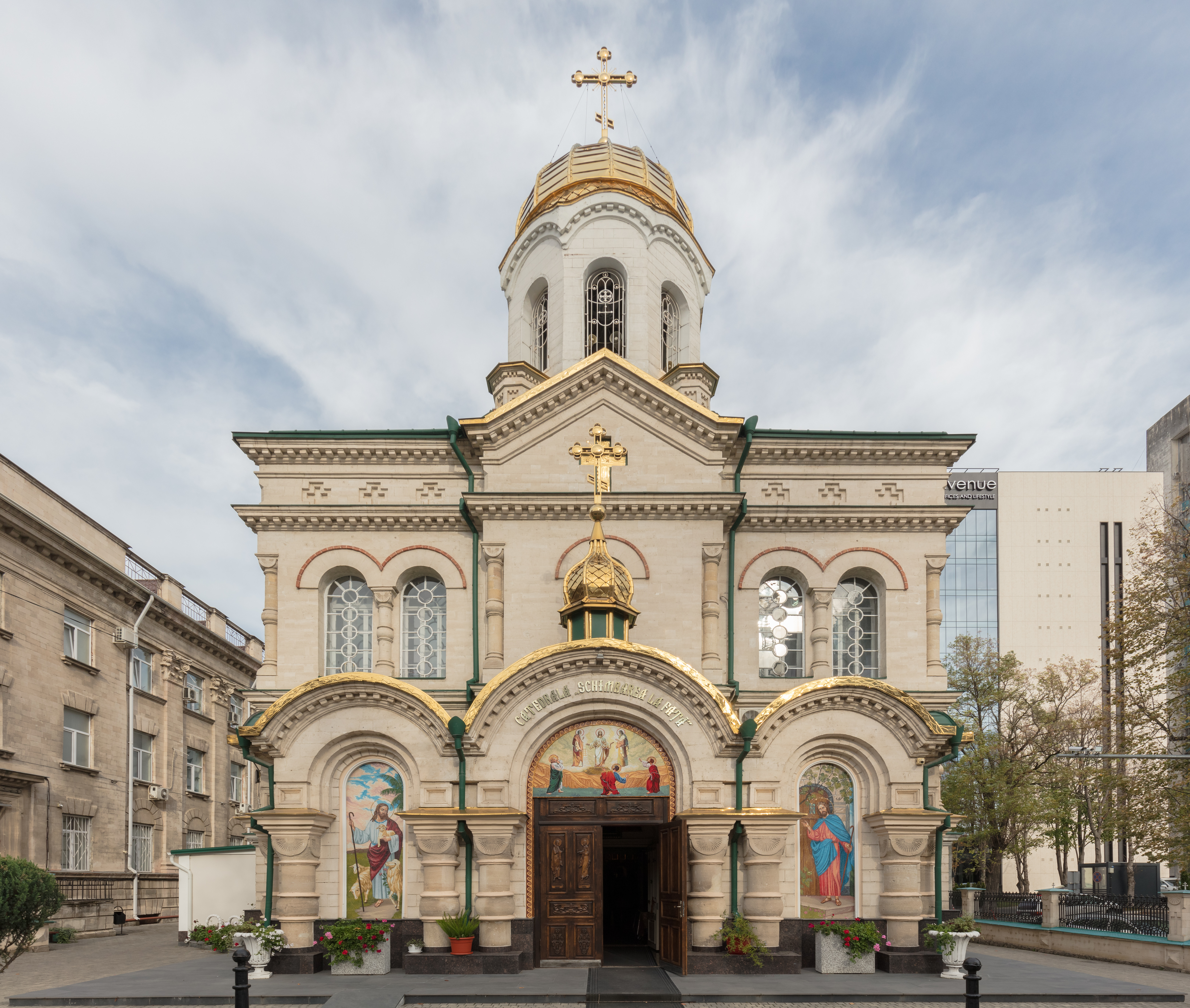
- Transfiguration Church
- Location: Bd Stefan CEl Mare nr.164-A, Chișinău
- Country: Moldova
- Denomination: Moldovan Orthodox Church
- Website: http://csf.md/

History
- Former name: Sf. Impărați Constantin și Elena
- Founded: 1899
- Founder: Constantin A. Namestnik
- Consecrated: 19 May 1902

Architecture
- Architect: Mihail Seroținski
- Architectural type: Russo-Byzantine

The Transfiguration Church (Romanian: Biserica Schimbarea la Față) is a Moldovan Orthodox church located in Chișinău, Moldova.

== History ==
Originally named after SS. Constantine and Helen, the church was part of the now disappeared Michael the Brave "gymnasium" for boys, built between 1898 and 1902 by the architect Mihail Seroținski.

The church was not built at the same time as other buildings of the gymnasium. Its construction completely relied on the initiative of the protector of the establishment, the public figure and philanthropist Constantin A. Namestnik. He sought by any means to achieve the construction of the monument, to such a point that he engaged his responsibility for the good progress of the works on his own fortune. Construction began in 1899 under the authority of Seroținski. The church was consecrated on 19 May 1902.

During the Cold War the space race was raging between United States and USSR. After the success of Yuri Gagarin in 1961 a great propaganda campaign was initiated across the Soviet Union and many planetaria began to appear. Churches, useless as the gospel was generally forbidden, were sometimes transformed into planetaria because of their domes. This was the fate of the Transfiguration Church from 1962 until a fire ravaged it in 1990. The devices for the planetarium were too expensive to make the rebuilding profitable and the attraction closed for good on 24 October 1991. The wrecked building was eventually handed back to the Orthodox Church.

After several refurbishment works during the post-Soviet years, the church is now completely renovated and open to the public.

== Gallery ==
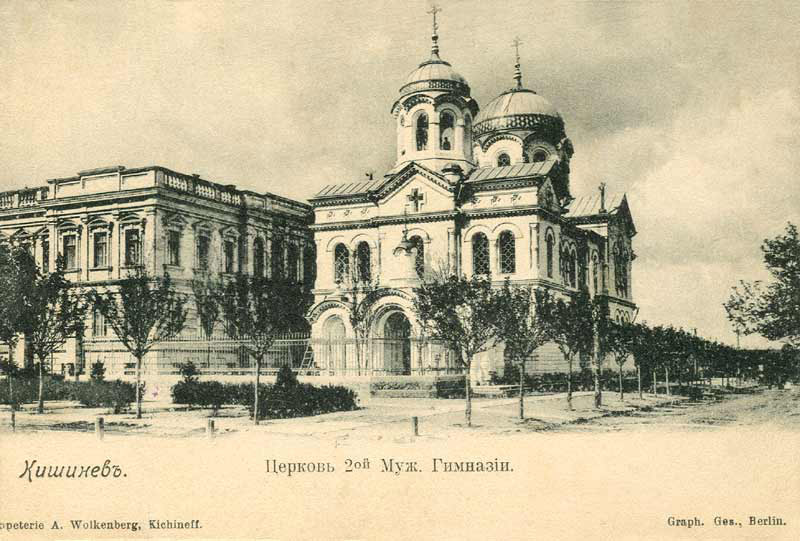

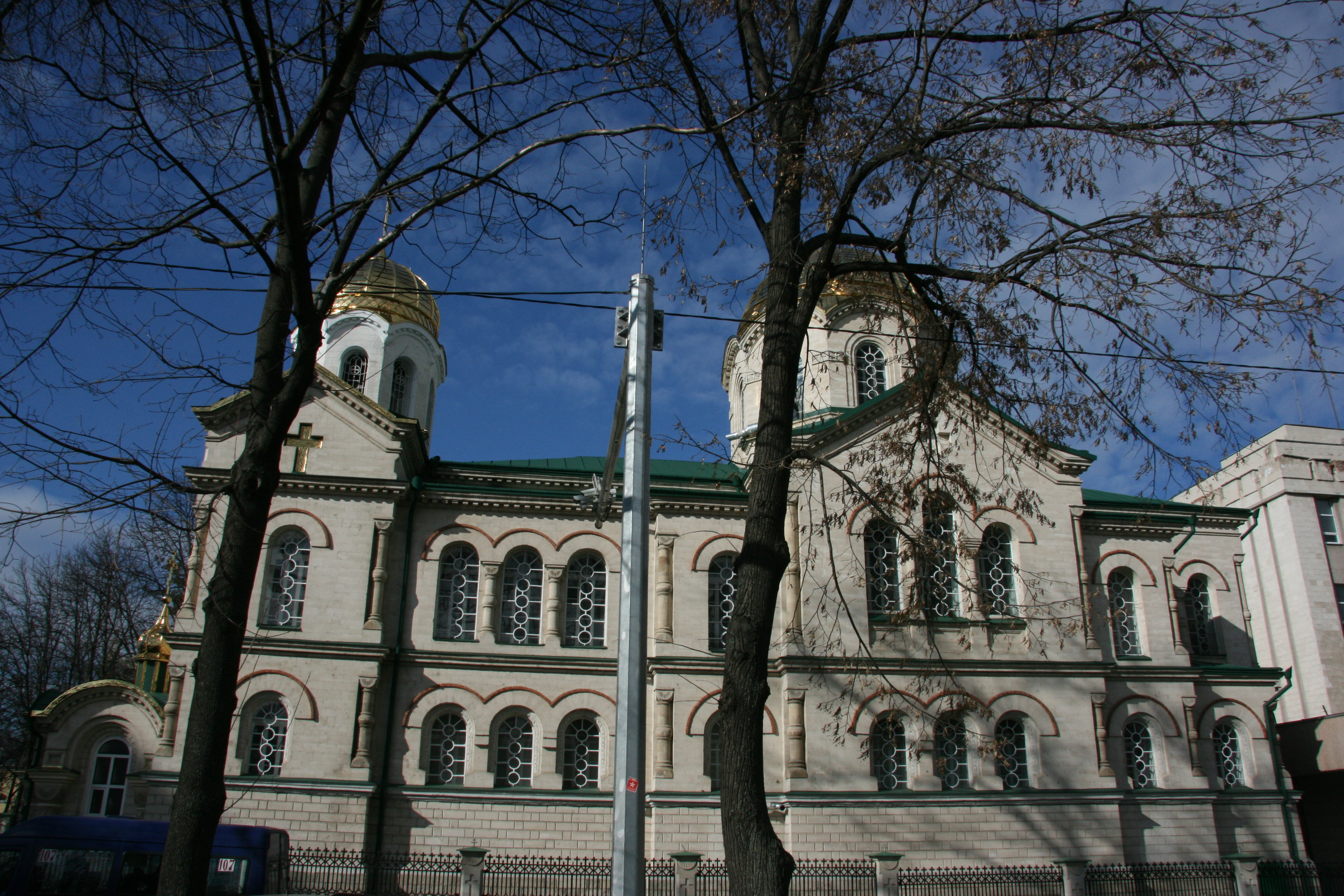

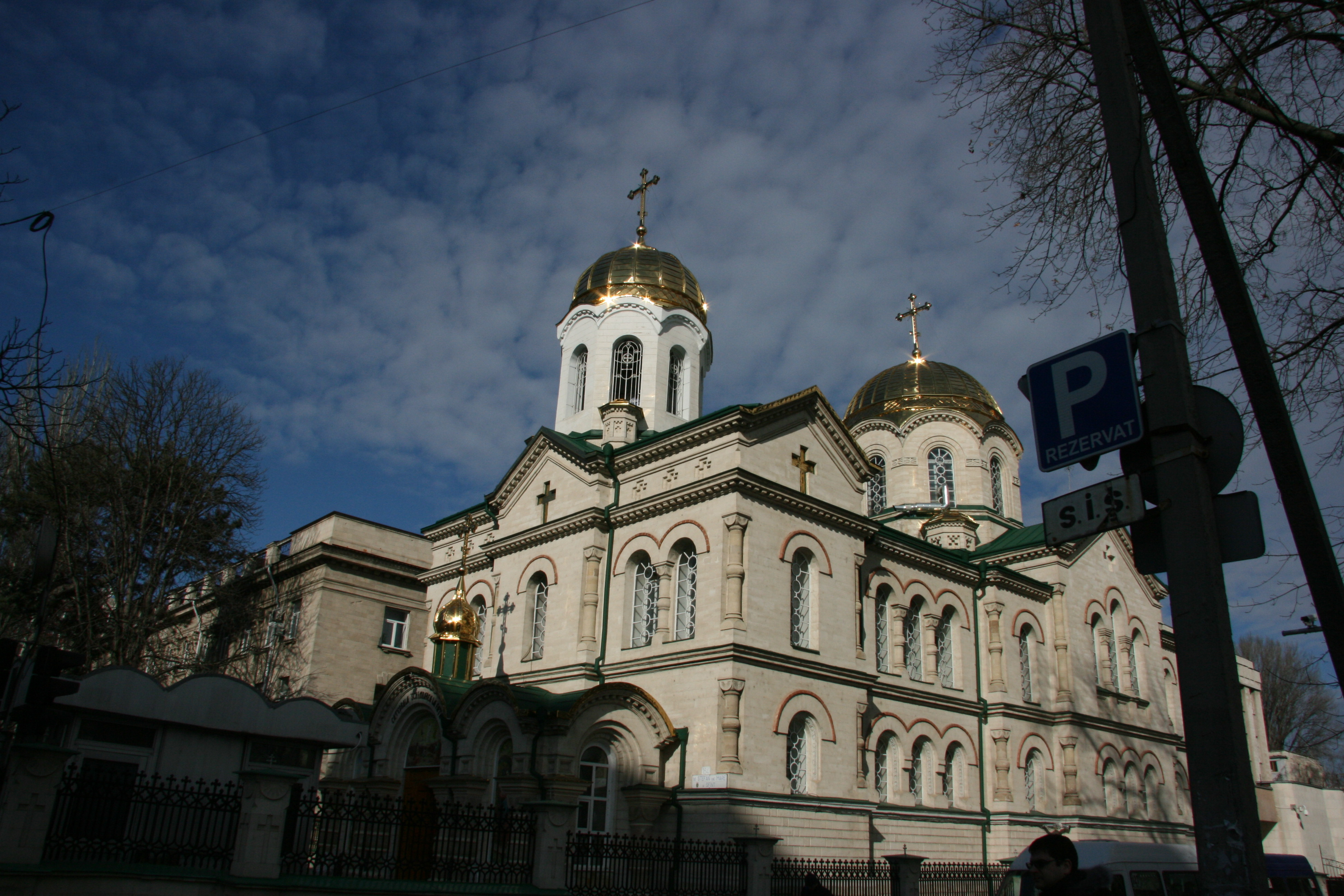
