= Church of Transfiguration, Ramallah =

Church in Ramallah, West Bank, Palestine

Coordinates: 31°54′13.57″N 35°11′48.2″E

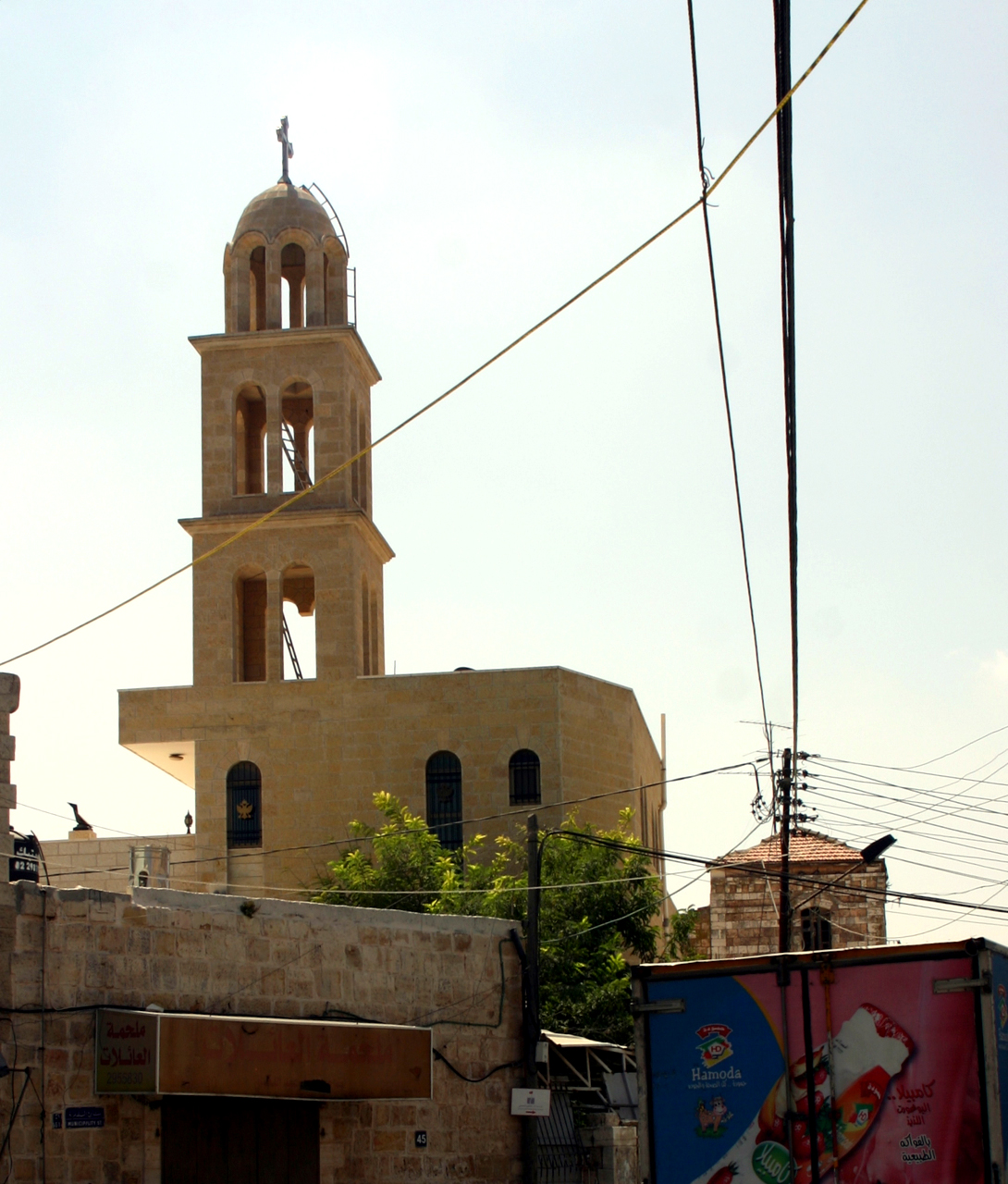
The Greek Orthodox church in Ramallah, Palestine.

The Greek Orthodox Church of Transfiguration (Arabic: كنيسة تجلي الرب للروم الأرثوذكس) is a church in Ramallah, West Bank, Palestine. It was inaugurated in 1852. The Basilica is of Byzantine style. The church contains sacred utensils and old icons, some of which date back to 1830 and were transferred to the church after the destruction of small churches in Ramallah as a result of persecution and several wars.

The leader of the convent is the patriarchate representative, since the orthodox congregation is under the leadership of the Greek Orthodox Church of Jerusalem, which assigns its local spiritual leader, the priests, and the committee of trustees of the church. The people who pray in this church are mainly the residents of Ramallah and the surrounding villages.
