= Church of the Transfiguration (Olkhovchik) =

Church in Rostov Oblast, Russia

Church of the Transfiguration of the Savior
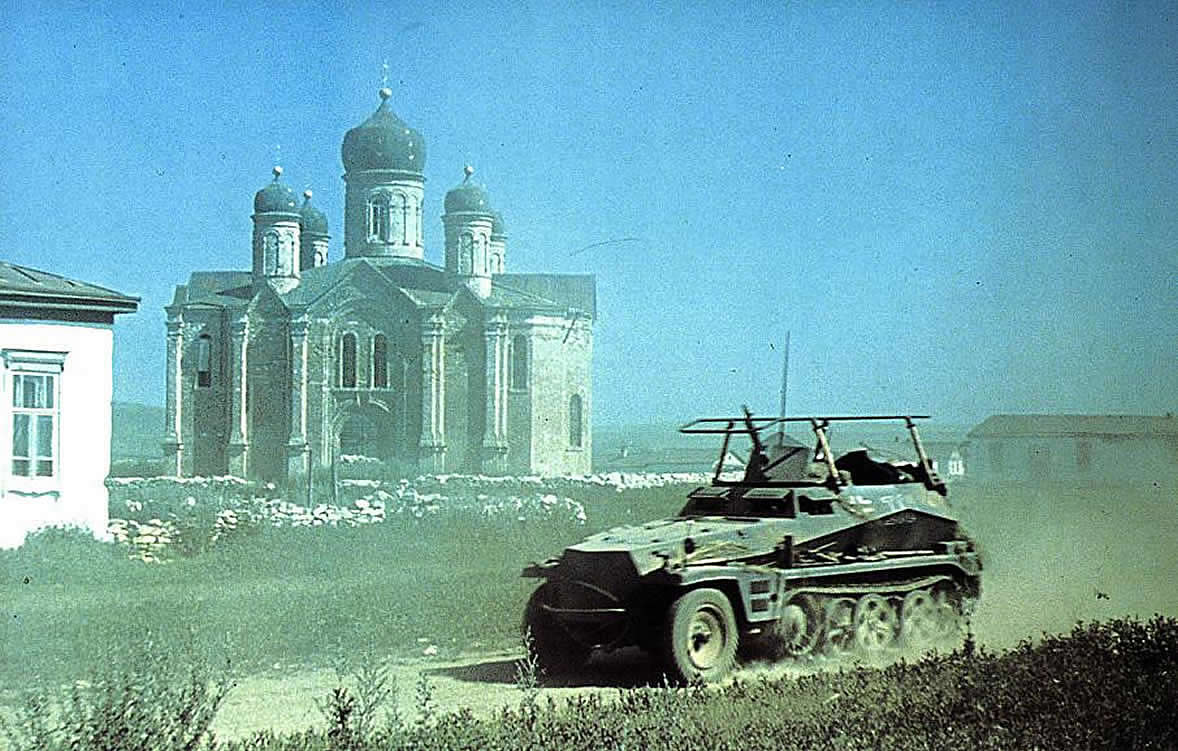
- Sd.Kfz. 250 in front of the church, May 1942

Religion
- Affiliation: Russian Orthodox

Location
- Location: Olkhovchik, Chertkovsky District, Rostov Oblast, Russia
- Interactive map of Church of the Transfiguration of the Savior
- Coordinates: 49.1624°N 40.4706°E

Architecture
- Completed: 1873

The Church of the Transfiguration of the Savior (Russian: Церковь Спаса Преображения) is a Russian Orthodox church in the village of Olkhovchik, Chertkovsky District, Rostov Oblast, Russia, that was built in 1873. It belongs to Chertkovo-Kalitva Deanery of the Diocese of Shakhty.

== History ==
The сhurch in the village of Olkhovchik, dedicated to the transfiguration of Jesus, was built and consecrated in 1873 with the active participation of local residents. In 1888, on the funds collected by parishioners, a parochial school was built, in which, according to 1912 data, more than 100 children were studying. The walls of the church were made brick, and the roof was covered with iron, though the bell tower was not. Prior to the Russian Revolution, the church had a choir.

In 1926, during the anti-religious campaign launched by the Soviet authorities, the Church of the Transfiguration of the Savior was closed. In 1942, former parishioners appealed to the authorities for the church to be reopened, but were refused on the grounds that the church building had been used as a granary by that time. However, it also saved the building from destruction.

Today the church is open again. As of 2015, works on restoration of the building were being carried out.
