= Church of the Transfiguration, Buffalo =

Church of the Transfiguration
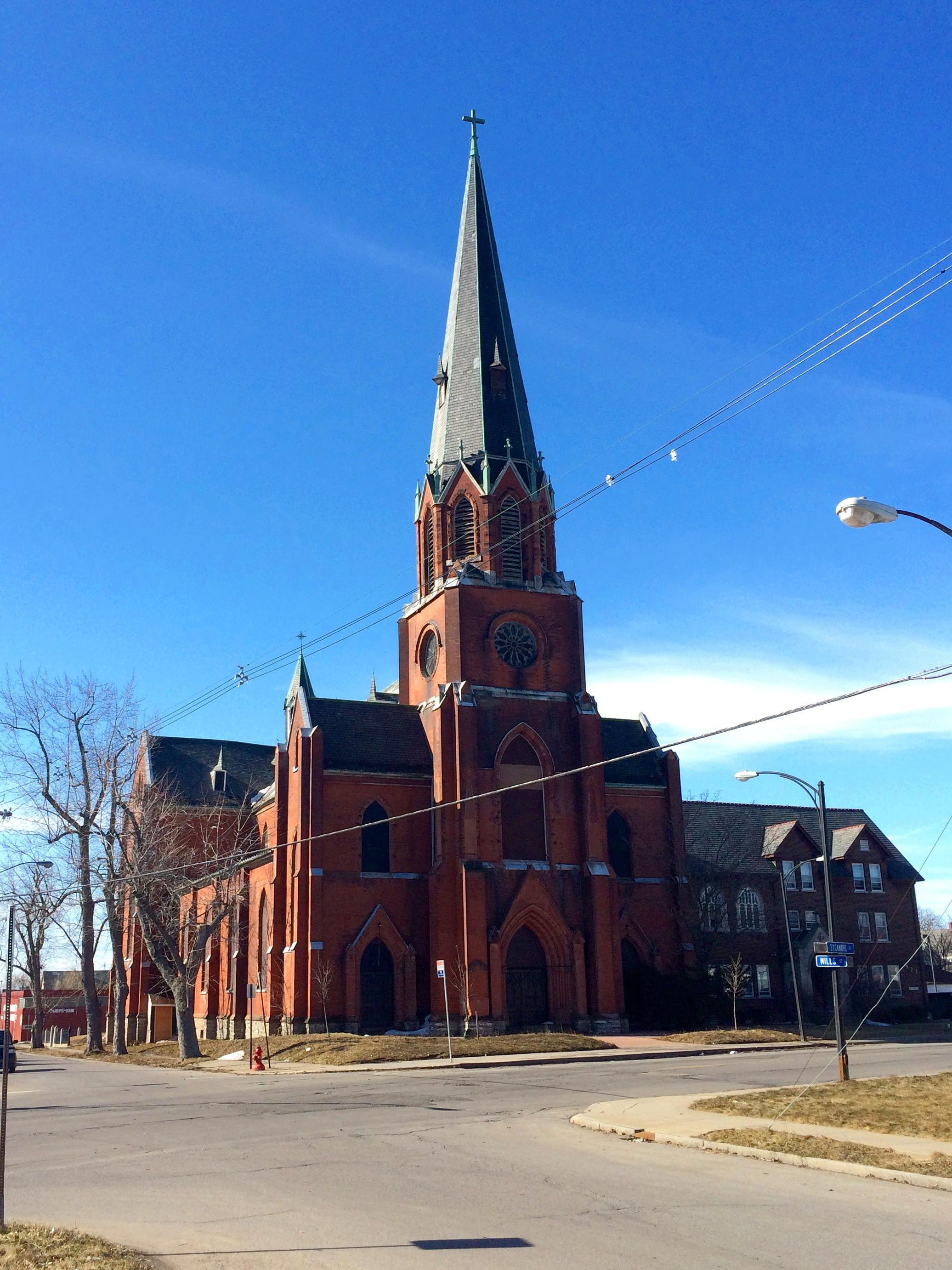
- Church of the Transfiguration
- 42.898003°N 78.836918°W
- Location: Buffalo, New York
- Country: United States
- Denomination: Roman Catholic Church

The Church of Transfiguration is a Gothic Revival style building in Buffalo, New York, on the corner of Mills and Sycamore Street. It was saved from demolition by a private company in 1994 with promise of renovation, though it still remains mostly untouched. While some efforts to maintain and restore the church have been made, the building remains vacant.

== History ==
The Church of Transfiguration was built by a community of Polish immigrants in 1896 for $76,000, designed in the Gothic Revival style to match the aesthetics of several other buildings in the city. It was opened for religious services the following year and remained in use until 1991, when its Polish parishioners moved to Buffalo's suburbs and other locations in the United States. Although permission for demolition was obtained in 1994, the church was saved with a sale of the building to Paul Francis Associates for $7,000. They made a promise to revive the building, and in 2007 some improvements and repairs were made to maintain it. Roof improvements and window repairs were evident, but much more work is needed before it can be used as a church again. Though the building is well into its second century, it sits vacant and disused.

On Monday November 16, 2020, the roof completely collapsed following a storm with high winds.

== See also ==
- Catholicism in the United States
- Church of the Transfiguration
