= Church of the Transfiguration (Blue Mountain Lake, New York) =

Historic church in New York, United States

- U.S. National Register of Historic Places
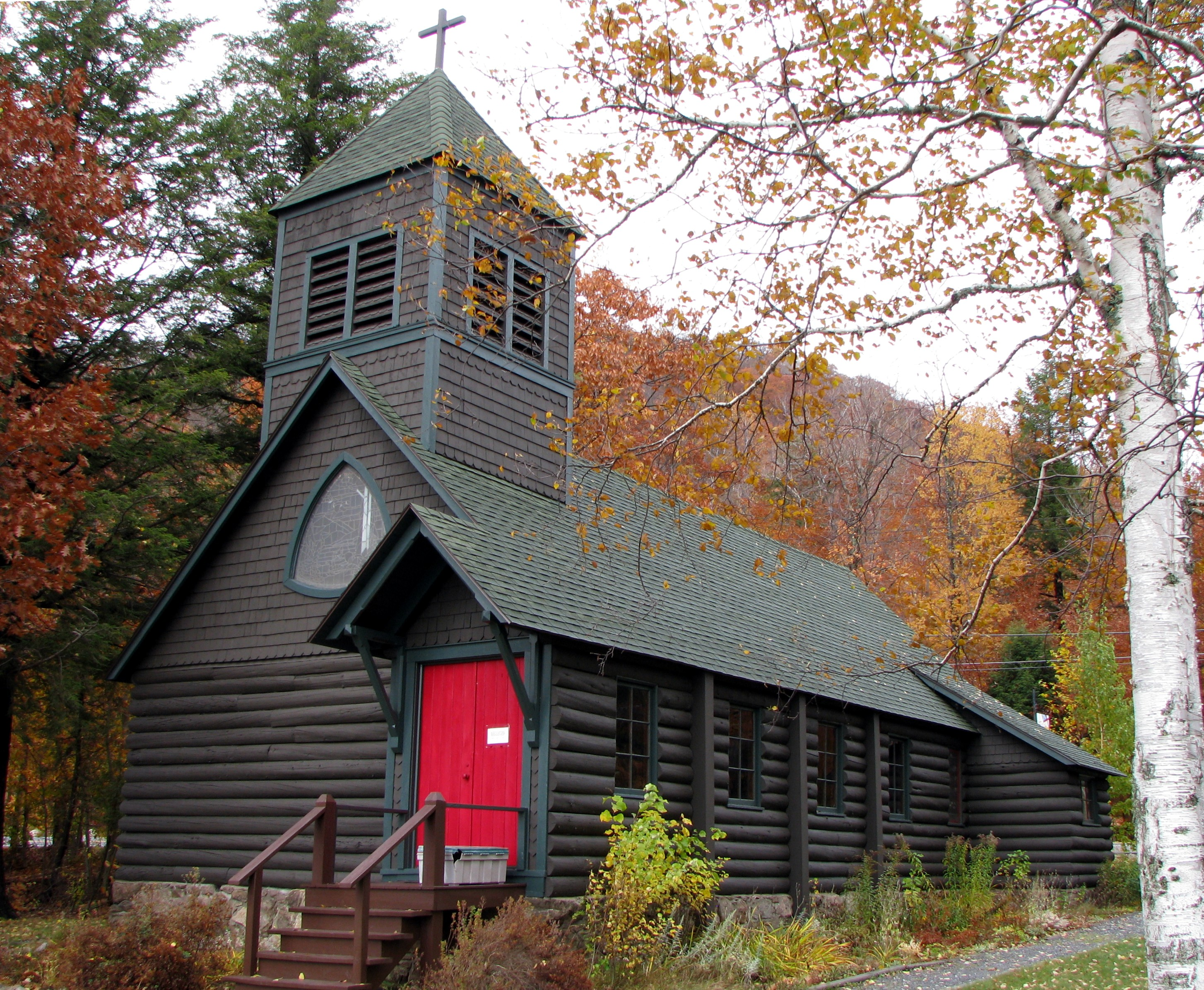

- Location within New York Location within the United States
- Nearest city: Blue Mountain Lake, New York
- Coordinates: 43°51′34″N 74°25′55″W
- Area: less than one acre
- Architect: Manley N. Cutter; Thomas Wallace (builder)
- Architectural style: Rustic
- NRHP reference No.: 77000942
- Added to NRHP: July 26, 1977

Church of the Transfiguration is a historic Episcopal church located at Blue Mountain Lake in Hamilton County, New York, United States.

== Architecture ==
The church is a small, one story, gable roofed structure with a central belfry at the west end, which faces the lake by which many worshipers would have arrived on boats in the years after the church was built. The building was built in 1885 and is constructed of barked spruce logs, mitred at the corners, and set upon a high foundation of random fieldstone. The church features Tiffany glass windows and a Meneely bell donated by Mrs. Levi P. Morton, wife of Benjamin Harrison's vice president. The original bellcote was replaced by the current tower in early 20th century.

== History ==
It was designed by Manley N. Cutter and built by Thomas Wallace. Like many seasonal churches that only held services during the summer, the church depended on the voluntary services of vacationing clergy and seminarians on summer break. The church was added to the National Register of Historic Places in 1977.
