= Church of the Transfiguration (San Jose, California) =

Church in California, US

- Location within San Jose, California
- 37°15′41″N 121°53′28″W
- Country: USA
- Denomination: Roman Catholic
- Website: Website

History
- Status: Parish church

Architecture
- Functional status: Active

Administration
- Province: Ecclesiastical province of San Francisco
- Archdiocese: Archidioecesis Sancti Francisci
- Diocese: Dioecesis Sancti Josephi in California
- Deanery: Deanery 7

Clergy
- Bishop: The Most Rev. Oscar Cantú
- Dean: Rev. Fr. Christopher Bennett (Santa Teresa Parish)
- Pastor: Rev. Fr. Tito Jesus Cartagenas

The Church of the Transfiguration is a Roman Catholic parish community, located in San Jose, California. The parish serves 750 families in the Diocese of San Jose. The church was founded in 1965 as a parish of the Archdiocese of San Francisco, and is named for the Transfiguration of Jesus.
