= Church of the Transfiguration (Obukhovka) =

Church in Rostov Oblast, Russia

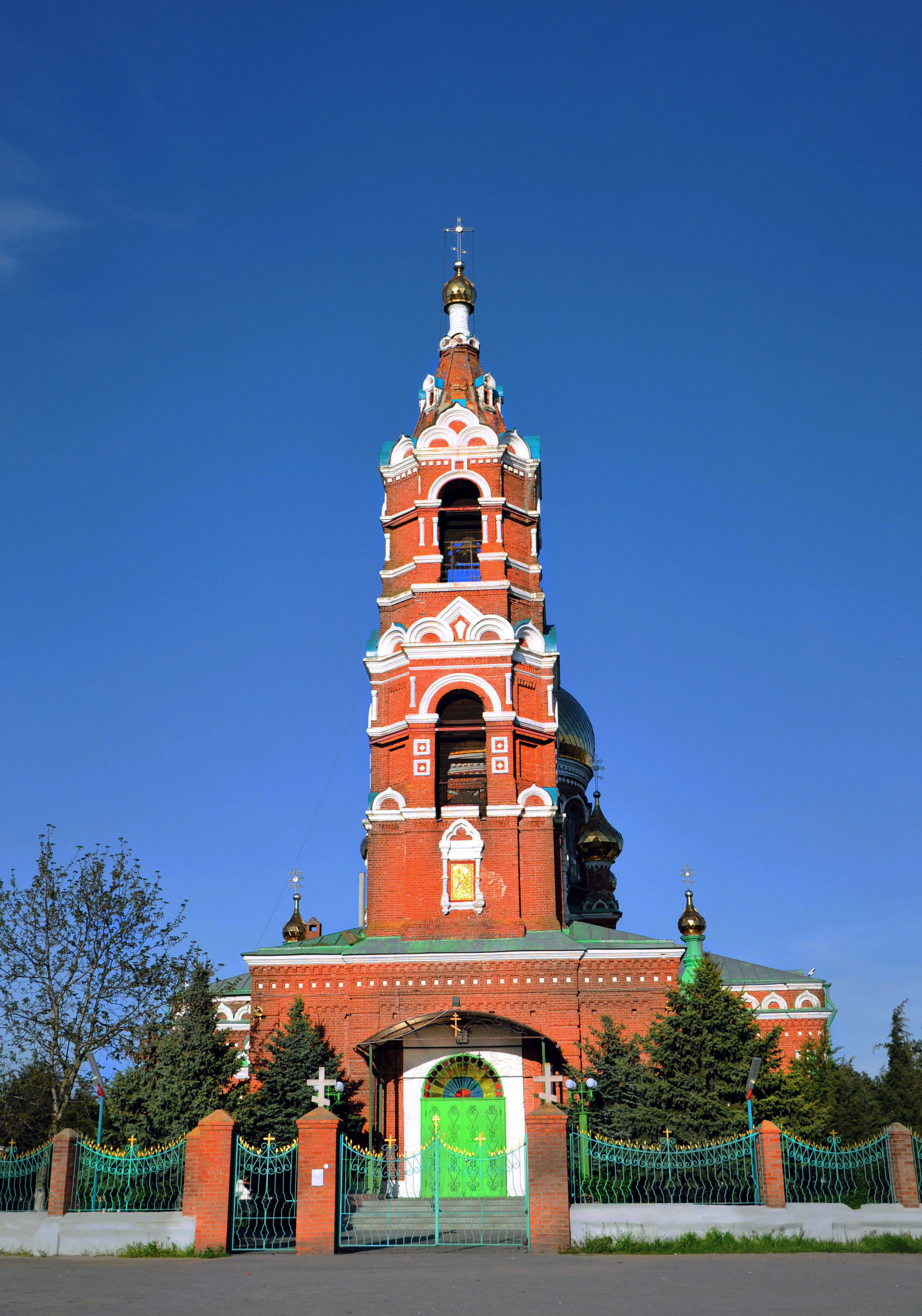

Religion
- Affiliation: Russian Orthodox

Location
- Location: Obukhovka, Rostov Oblast, Russia
- Interactive map of Church of the Transfiguration

Architecture
- Completed: 1864

Church of the Transfiguration (Russian: Церковь Спаса Преображения) is a Russian Orthodox church in the village of Obukhovka, Azovsky District, Rostov Oblast, Russia. It belongs to the Diocese of Rostov and Novocherkassk. It was built in 1864 in pseudo-Russian style.

== History ==
Construction of the church began on August 22, 1861 ― the day when construction site was consecrated. Construction works were progressing rather quickly as all local dwellers participated in them, and by August 1864 they had been finished. On July 3, 1866, the church was consecrated by priest Ioann Dikov.

In 1890, in the church at its southern side there was built a chapel, which was consecrated in honour of St. Andrew of Crete. Four years later, in the northern side there was also arranged a second chapel in the name of Sts Constantine and Helena.

Although it was constantly expanding, by 1910 the building could no longer accommodate all the parishioners. Parishioners and priests of the church had to appeal to the Regional Board of the Don Cossacks with the application for extension of the church. In 1912, the parishioners petitioned again, this time on the construction of the bell tower by architect G.N. Vasilyev. Construction work is likely to be completed in 1913, although there is no exact data on this matter.

In 1940 the Soviet authorities planned to close the church. However, the parishioners managed to save it from encroachment: the locals had staged around the clock, not allowing representatives of the authorities to come. One day, after another conflict with the authorities, the elderly and children, along with father Nicholas locked up in the church and announced that it would have to be blow up together with them.

The church still stood during another anti-religious campaign even during the tenure of Nikita Khrushchev: delegation of Communist party representatives were stoned. Thus, the church became one of the few where religious services never ceased and have never been looted.
