= Transfiguration Church (Cleveland) =

Transfiguration Church (historic)
- Location within Ohio
- 41.45596°N 81.63631°W
- Location: Cleveland, Ohio
- Country: United States
- Denomination: Roman Catholic Church
- Previous denomination: Baptist

History
- Former name: Trinity Baptist Church
- Status: Parish church
- Dedication: Transfiguration of Jesus

Architecture
- Functional status: Demolished
- Architect(s): F.S. Barnum & Co.
- Architectural type: Church
- Style: English Gothic
- Completed: 1901
- Closed: 1992

Specifications
- Capacity: 550 (1901); 950 (after 1945)

Administration
- Province: Cincinnati
- Diocese: Cleveland

Transfiguration Church (Polish: Parafia Przemienienia Pańskiego w Cleveland), was a Catholic parish church in Cleveland, Ohio, in the United States. Part of the Roman Catholic Diocese of Cleveland, it was located at the southwest corner of the intersection of Broadway Avenue and Fullerton Avenue in a part of the South Broadway neighborhood previously known in Polish as Warszawa, also referred to today as Slavic Village. The church suffered a severe structure fire in 1990. The parish closed in 1992, and the church was demolished in early 1993. The records of this church, and all churches closed after 1975, can be found in the Catholic Diocese of Cleveland Archives. Diocesan policy is to keep all archive records closed.

== History ==
=== Trinity Baptist ===
Trinity Baptist Church was organized in March 1873 with Rev. F. Tolhurst as the first pastor. The church dedicated its first building on Fullerton Street (at the intersection with Wood Street) on February 13, 1876.

In February 1892, Trinity Baptist Church purchased two lots on the corner of Broadway Avenue and Fullerton Street for $8,565 ($300,000 in 2025 dollars). Fundraising to erect the new structure took eight years. In 1910, the church hired F.S. Barnum & Co., a local architectural firm, to design the new structure. The church was in the English Gothic architectural style, made of red brick with buff stone trim. The nave was designed as a bowl, with seating in pews for 550 people. The rear wall of the chancel was actually a sliding door. When opened, an additional 500 seats could be added in the social hall behind the chancel. The chancel contained a significant space for both the choir and the organ. The structure had an unfinished basement, and a two-story Sunday School classroom building was attached. The total cost of the building was $20,000 ($800,000 in 2025 dollars). Construction began in July 1900, and the church was dedicated on September 15, 1901. The final cost of the building was $30,000 ($1,200,000 in 2025 dollars).

A Spiritualist church purchased the old Trinity Baptist structure, which completely renovated the building. It opened as the First Spiritualist Temple (and first Spiritualist church in Cleveland) on October 1, 1905.

Trinity Baptist Church incurred a mortgage of $7,500 ($300,000 in 2025 dollars) to complete its new building. The church paid off the mortgage in April 1906, which included a $2,500 ($100,000 in 2025 dollars) donation from John D. Rockefeller. The congregation raised another $3,000 ($100,000 in 2025 dollars) which it used to install an organ in June 1906.

=== Establishment of Transfiguration Church ===
In the late 1930s and the early 1940s, the neighborhood around Trinity Baptist Church began to decline due to rapid industrialization and the construction of several nearby steel mills. Trinity Baptist saw a steady decline in membership, dipping to just 670 members by 1942. The church agreed to merge with Garfield Heights Baptist Church in the nearby suburb of Garfield Heights, Ohio, which had a large, new structure. In April 1943, Trinity Baptist Church sold its building to the Roman Catholic Diocese of Cleveland for $35,000 ($700,000 in 2025 dollars).

The Roman Catholic Diocese of Cleveland erected Transfiguration Parish on July 30, 1943. The parish was divided from nearby Immaculate Heart of Mary Church and Shrine Church of St. Stanislaus parishes. Reverend Joseph F. Zabawa was named the pastor of the new congregation, which took up residence in the Trinity Baptist Church building.

Transfiguration Church served Slavic Village's Polish community, with services conducted in Polish. In time, the church was enlarged to seat 950, and a convent was built. (Note: There was also a rectory, but it is unclear if this was built prior to the Catholic ownership or after.)

=== Closure of Transfiguration Church ===
The continuing job and population losses among blue-collar workers in the area around Slavic Village left 40 percent of the area's housing stock abandoned and demolished. By 1989, housing foreclosure rates in the area reached 35 percent, causing runaway neighborhood decline. Attendance at Transfiguration declined to about 700, which led the diocese to close the church's elementary school in the spring of 1990.

On October 19, 1990, faulty wiring in a dropped ceiling in the basement of the church caused a fire that broke out at 5:35 AM. The intense fire burned a hole in the roof and destroyed the basement, choir loft, organ, nave, and several stained glass windows. The classroom building was untouched. The chancel was largely spared, allowing the Eucharistic chalice, tabernacle, and many vestments to survive.

Damage to the building was estimated at $500,000 ($1,200,000 in 2025 dollars). Although both nearby St. Stanislaus and Immaculate Heart of Mary churches provided worship space to the parishioners of Transfiguration Church, attendance at Transfiguration's masses dwindled. Transfiguration later held mass in a classroom in its closed elementary school, but attendance continued to decline and reached only 100 by 1992. The diocese determined that the cost of repairing the church would exceed the insurance payment, no priest could be found to take over at Transfiguration, and the church was running a deficit of $5,000 ($11,471.4 in 2025 dollars) a month. After consulting with a parish task force, the diocese suppressed the parish on January 1, 1992. Bishop Anthony Pilla announced the closure in October 1992.

The final mass at Transfiguration was held on November 8, 1992. Salvaged items from the church were dispersed to other Catholic churches and organizations, and insurance proceeds and other funds given to nearby diocesan churches.

== Priests ==
Assigned Priests
Start	End	Name	Surname	Position
22 February 1989	1 August 1989	Lawrence	Jurcak	Administrator
30 March 1982	1989	Marian	Kencik	Pastor
20 July 1971		Henry	Jezeski	Pastor
30 September 1969	20 July 1971	Norman A.	Gajdzinski	Parochial Vicar
		Edward	Gackowski	Pastor
30 September 1948	19 May 1959	Leon	Telesz	Parochial Vicar
		Joseph	Zabawa	Pastor

== See also ==
- Shrine Church of St. Stanislaus
- Immaculate Heart of Mary Church
