= St. George's Church (Sandata) =

Coordinates: 46.2706°N 41.7814°E

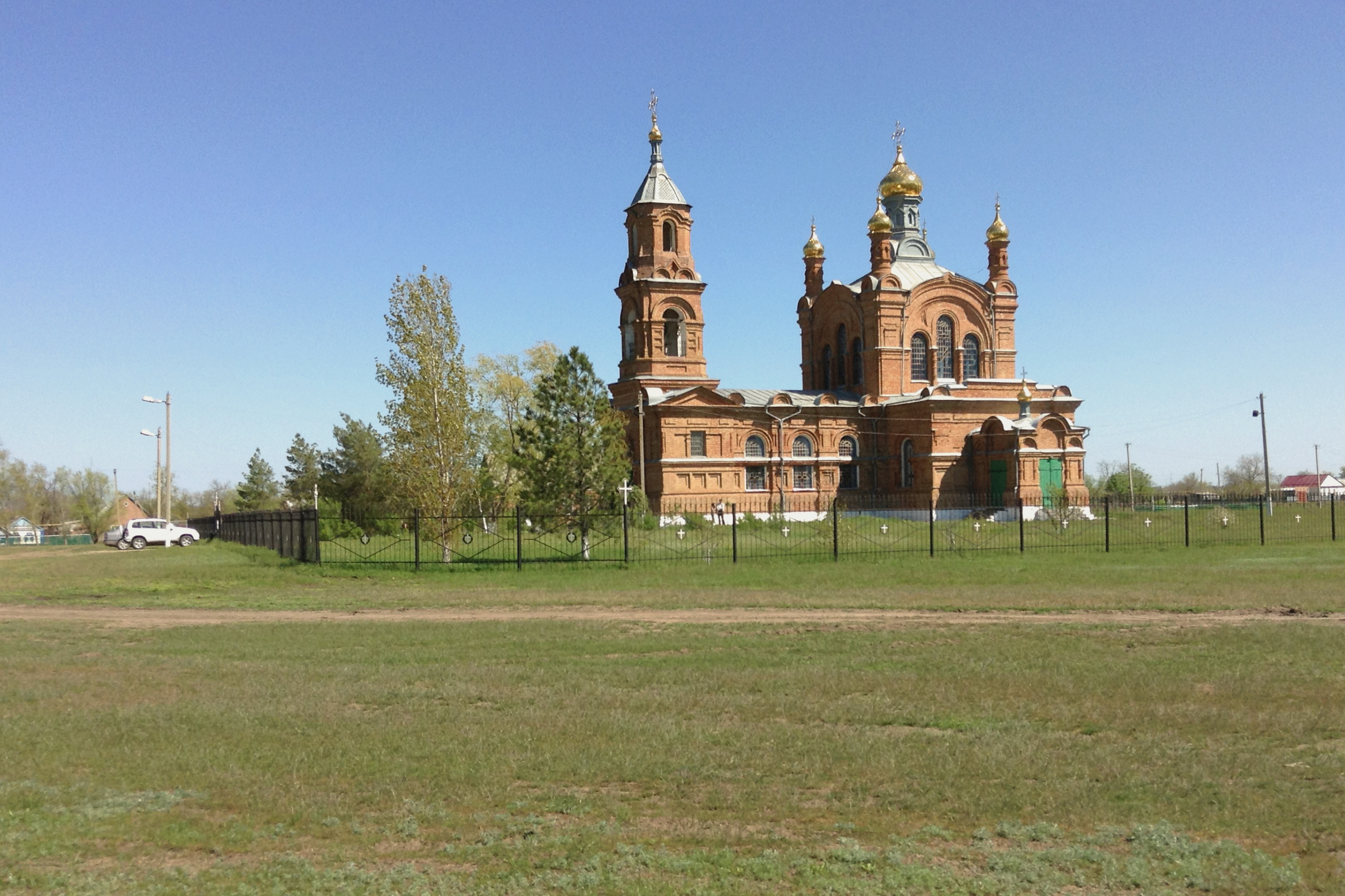

Religion
- Affiliation: Russian Orthodox

Location
- Location: Sandata, Salsky District, Rostov Oblast, Russia
- Interactive map of St. George's Church

Architecture
- Completed: 1912

St. George's Church is a Russian Orthodox church in the village of Sandata, Salsky District, Rostov Oblast, Russia. It belongs to Volgodonsk Diocese of the Moscow Patriarchate and was built in the early 20th century.

== History ==
Sandata village was founded in 1805, and the first church there was established almost half a century later, the Church of the Protection of the Holy Virgin, constructed in 1851. It also had a Sunday school.

The Church of St. George, according to longtime residents, was built in 1912 (although there is no accurate data about it).

In 1960, during the anti-religious campaign of Nikita Khrushchev, the church was closed after the death of the church's priest; St. George's was the only remaining church in the village. Local residents tried to defend the structure and would not let party representatives in. The authorities falsely promised locals that the church and its equipment would be preserved; the bell tower was demolished, but the main church building survived.

In the 1970s, the church housed a grain warehouse, which subsequently burnt down (probably due to spontaneous combustion). In 1989, the church began to be repaired, and the main works were finished two years later.
