= St. Nicholas' Church (Bogdanov) =

- Церковь Николая Чудотворца
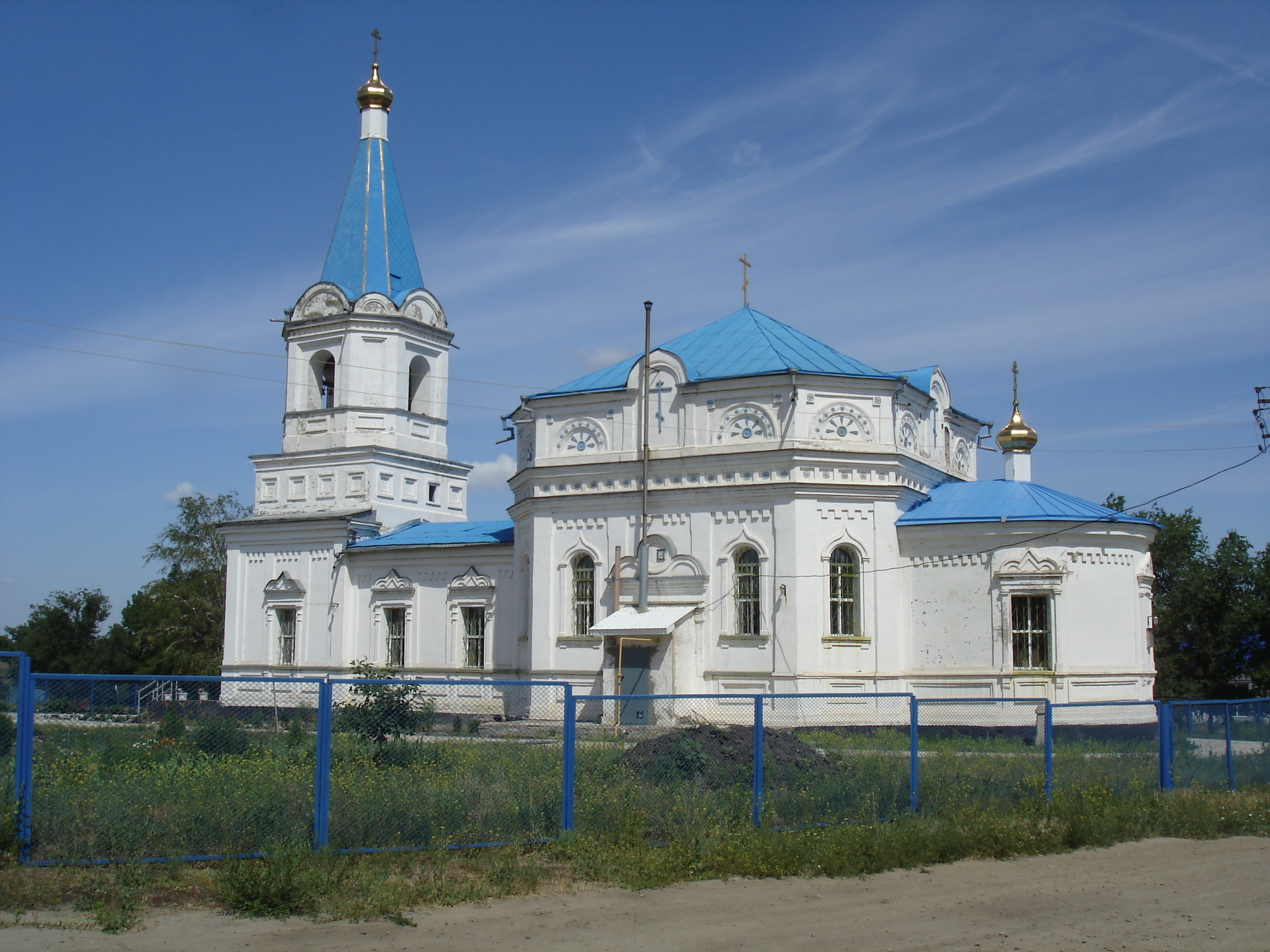
- St. Nicholas' Church in 2014
- St. Nicholas' Church
- Location: Bogdanov khutor, Kamensky District, Rostov Oblast
- Country: Russia
- Denomination: Eastern Orthodox

History
- Status: Parish church
- Dedication: Saint Nicholas

Architecture
- Functional status: Active
- Completed: 1891

Administration
- Division: Patriarchate of Moscow and All Russia
- Diocese: Shakhty and Millerovo Diocese
- Deanery: Kamenskoe deanery

The Saint Nicholas Church (Russian: Церковь Николая Чудотворца) is a Russian Orthodox church in Bogdanov khutor, Kamensky District, Rostov Oblast, Russia. Built in 1891, it belongs to the Kamenskoe deanery of the Shakhty and Millerovo Diocese of the Patriarchate of Moscow and All Russia.

== History ==
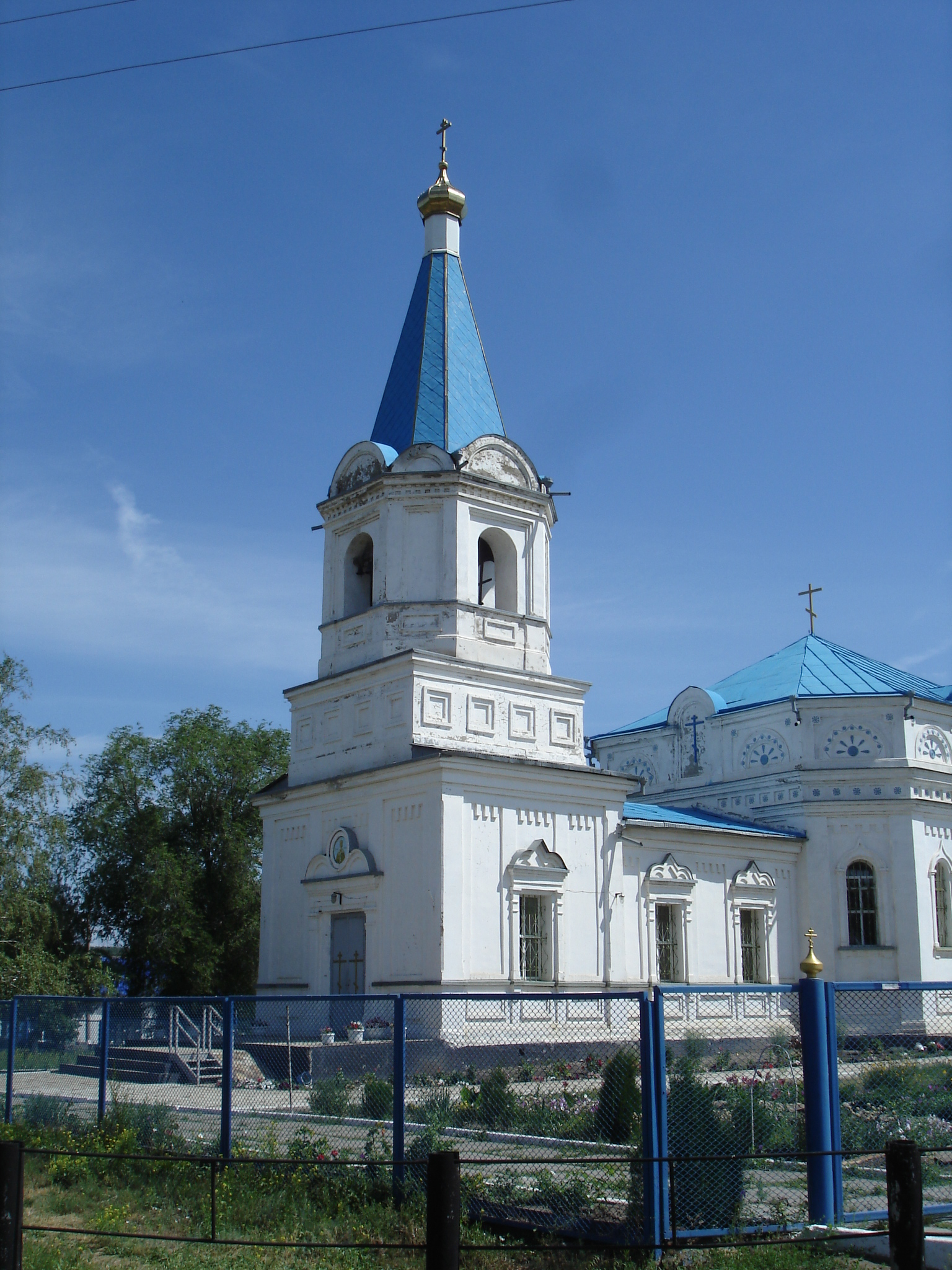
Bell tower

St. Nicholas Church in Bogdanov khutor was built in 1891. It is one of only four churches in the Kamensky district of Rostov Oblast which have survived since the October Revolution.

During the Soviet era, the church was closed. It was opened again in 1943, during the Great Patriotic War, right after the village was liberated from invading German forces. The Divine Liturgy was held in church until 1962, when the religious persecution during rule of Nikita Khrushchev began. There were some unsuccessful attempts made by local Soviet authorities to destroy the church, but later they decided to turn its building into a storehouse for Kirov collective farm.

The church was opened in 1990 for the third time. Members of the local Cossack community from Gundorovsky village also participated in its restoration works.
