= Rostov Oblast =

First-level administrative division of Russia

Rostov Oblast Ростовская область (Russian)
- Oblast
- Flag Coat of arms
- Anthem: "Anthem of Rostov Oblast" ("The Orthodox Quiet Don")
- Coordinates: 47°52′N 41°11′E
- Country: Russia
- Federal district: Southern
- Economic region: North Caucasus
- Established: September 13, 1937
- Administrative center: Rostov-on-Don

Government
  - Body: Legislative Assembly
  - Governor: Yury Slyusar

Area
  - Total: 100,967 km^{2} (38,984 sq mi)
  - Rank: 32nd

Population (2021 census)
  - Total: 4,200,729 ▼: 85.85% Russians; 2.05% Armenians; 0.96% Turks; 0.62% Ukrainians; 0.35% Romani people; 0.34% Chechens; 3.46% other; 6.37% not stated
  - Estimate (2018): 4,220,452
  - Rank: 6th
  - Density: 41.6050/km^{2} (107.756/sq mi)
  - Urban: 67.9%
  - Rural: 32.1%

GDP (nominal, 2024)
  - Total: ₽2.69 trillion (US$31.6 billion)
  - Per capita: ₽647,531 (US$7,598.26)
- Time zone: UTC+3 (MSK)
- ISO 3166 code: RU-ROS
- License plates: 61, 161, 761
- OKTMO ID: 60000000
- Official languages: Russian
- Website: www.donland.ru

Rostov Oblast (Note: Russian: Росто́вская о́бласть, romanized: Rostovskaya oblastʹ, IPA: [rɐˈstofskəjə ˈobləsʲtʲ]) is a federal subject of Russia (an oblast), located in the Southern Federal District. The oblast has an area of 100,967 square kilometers (38,984 sq mi) and a population of 4,200,729 (2021 Census), making it the sixth most populous federal subject in Russia. Its administrative center is the city of Rostov-on-Don, which also became the administrative center of the Southern Federal District in 2002.

== Geography ==
Rostov Oblast borders Ukraine (Donetsk and Luhansk Oblasts) and also Volgograd and Voronezh Oblasts in the north, Krasnodar and Stavropol Krais in the south, and the Republic of Kalmykia in the east. The Rostov oblast is located in the Pontic-Caspian steppe. It is directly north over the North Caucasus and west of the Yergeni hills.

It is within the Russian Southern Federal District.

=== Rivers and lakes ===
The Don River, one of Europe's longest rivers, flows through the oblast for part of its course. Lakes cover only 0.4% of the oblast's area.

== Administrative divisions ==
According to the Law "On the Administrative-territorial structure of the Rostov Region", the subject of the Russian Federation includes:

- 55 administrative-territorial entities:
- 12 urban districts
- 43 municipal districts and 408 administrative-territorial units:
  - 18 urban settlements
  - 390 rural settlements.

Within the framework of the administrative-territorial structure, they include settlements and districts in the city.

The administrative center of the Rostov Oblast is the city of Rostov-on-Don.

== Public authority ==
The system of public authorities of the Rostov region, formed in accordance with the Charter, consists of:

- Legislative Assembly of the Rostov Oblast (the highest and only body of legislative (representative) power)
- Governor of the Rostov Oblast (the highest official of the Rostov region)
- The Government of the Rostov Oblast (the highest executive authority)

== History ==
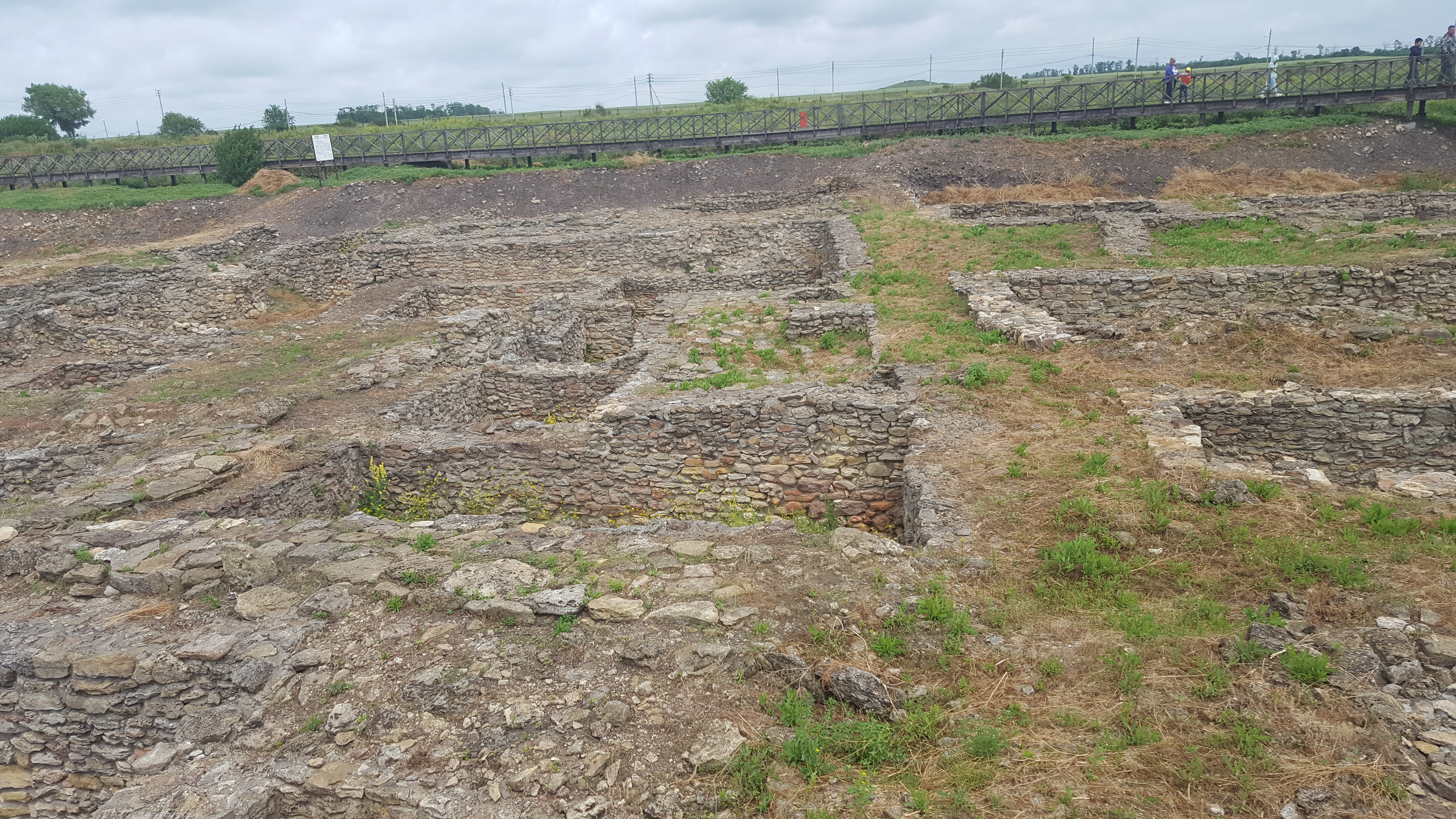
Tanais, former ancient Greek city and medieval Italian trading city

Historically, at various times, the territory was ruled either entirely or partly by Scythia, ancient Greeks, Old Great Bulgaria, Khazars, Kipchaks, Italians (Pisa, Venice, Genoa) the Mongol Empire, the Crimean Khanate, the Ottoman Empire, Russia and Soviet Ukraine. The ancient Greek city of Tanais is located in the province. Taganrog served as the capital of the Ukrainian Soviet Republic in March–April 1918, and was the place of establishment of the Communist Party of Ukraine.

The Rostov Oblast was formed in 1937 out of the Azov-Black Sea Krai. During World War II, it was occupied by Nazi Germany in 1941–1943.

== Demographics ==
Historical population
Year	Pop.	±%
1959	3,311,747	—
1970	3,831,262	+15.7%
1979	4,080,647	+6.5%
1989	4,308,654	+5.6%
2002	4,404,013	+2.2%
2010	4,277,976	−2.9%
2021	4,200,729	−1.8%
Source: Census data

Population: 4,200,729 (2021 census); 4,277,976 (2010 census); 4,404,013 (2002 census); 4,308,654 (1989 Soviet census).

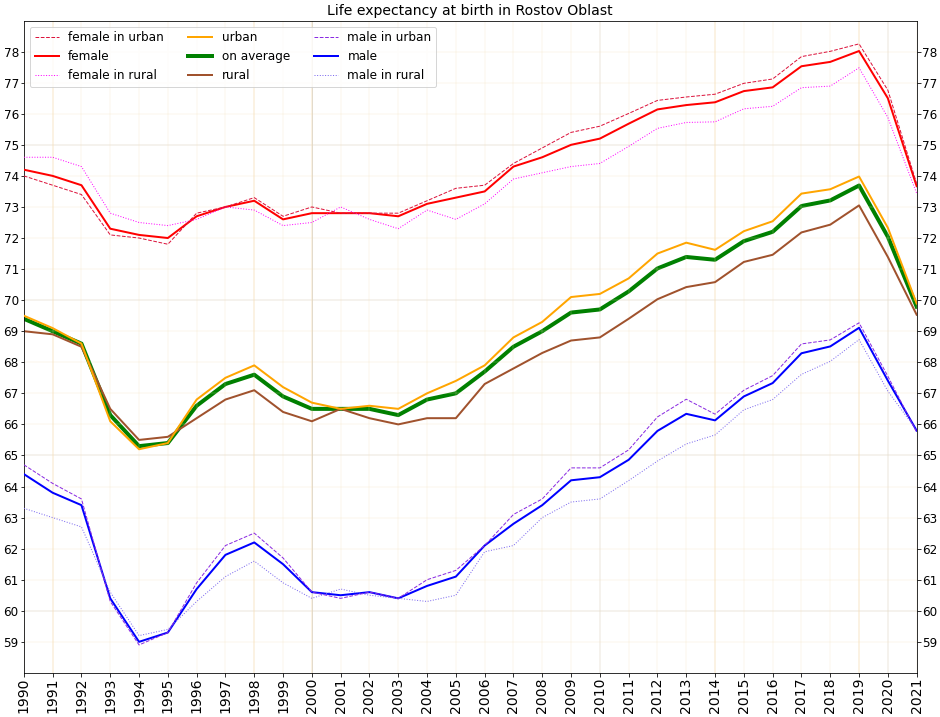
Life expectancy at birth in Rostov Oblast

Vital statistics for 2024:

- Births: 31,734 (7.7 per 1,000)
- Deaths: 55,483 (13.4 per 1,000)

Total fertility rate (2024):
1.29 children per woman

Life expectancy (2021):
Total — 69.79 years (male — 65.80, female — 73.67)

=== Ethnic groups ===
Residents identified themselves as belonging to 157 different ethnic groups, including 27 of more than 2,000 persons each. The largest ethnicities are the 3,795,607 Russians (90.3%); the 110,727 Armenians (2.6%) and the 77,802 Ukrainians (1.9%). Other important groups are the 35,902 Turks (0.9%); 16,493 Belarusians (0.4%); 13,948 Tatars (0.3%); 17,961 Azerbaijanis (0.4%); 11,449 Chechens (0.3%); 16,657 Romani (0.4%); 11,597 Koreans (0.3%); 8,296 Georgians (0.2%), and 2,040 Assyrians (.05%). There were also 76,498 people (1.8%) belonging to other ethno-cultural groupings. 76,735 people were registered from administrative databases, and could not declare an ethnicity. It is estimated that the proportion of ethnicities in this group is the same as that of the declared group.

=== Religion ===
Religion in Rostov Oblast as of 2012 (Sreda Arena Atlas)
Russian Orthodoxy	49.5%
Other Orthodox	0.8%
Other Christians	6%
Islam	1.1%
Rodnovery and other native faiths	0.5%
Spiritual but not religious	25.5%
Atheism and irreligion	11.6%
Other and undeclared	5%

According to a 2012 survey, 49.5% of the population of Rostov Oblast adheres to the Russian Orthodox Church, 6% are unaffiliated generic Christians, 1% are either Orthodox Christian believers who do not belong to church or are members of other (non-Russian) Orthodox bodies, 1% are Muslims, and 1% are adherents of the Slavic native faith (Rodnovery) movement. In addition, 26% of the population declares to be "spiritual but not religious", 12% is atheist, and 3.5% follows other religions or did not give an answer to the question.

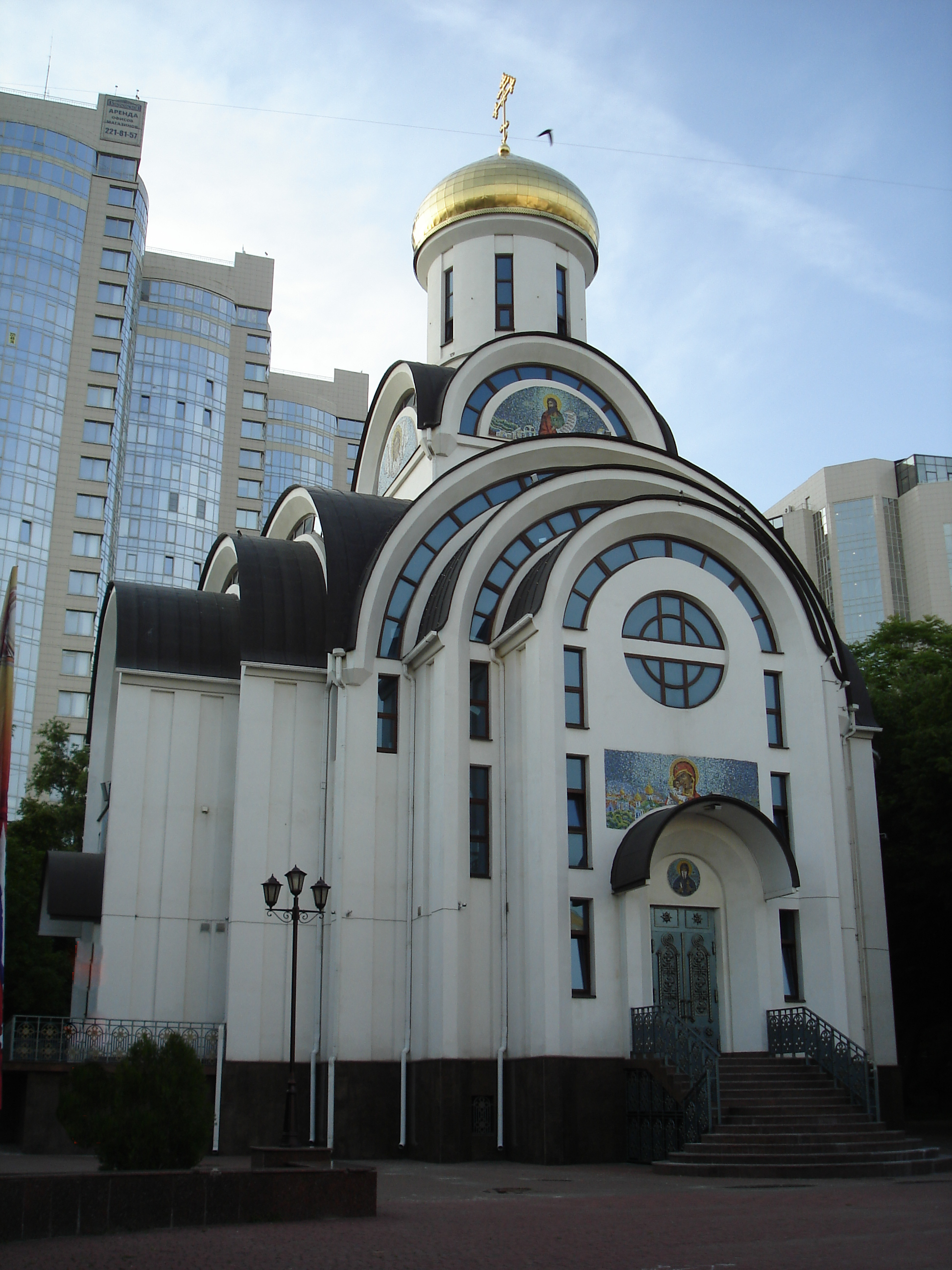
Church of the Intercession, Rostov-on-Don

The Ascension Cathedral is the largest Russian Orthodox church in Novocherkassk, Rostov Oblast, Russia. It used to be one of the largest churches of the Russian Empire and the main church of the Don Host Oblast.

The five-domed building, which stands 75 meters tall, is a notable example of Russian Neo-Byzantine architecture. It was erected between 1891 and 1904 on the site of an earlier church. The first church on the site was built to Luigi Rusca's designs. It collapsed in 1846. A replacement church collapsed 17 years later.

Church of the Intercession of the Holy Virgin ― one of the oldest churches in Rostov-on-Don. For a considerable period of time, Intercession Church served as the principal church not only for the fortress of St. Dimitry of Rostov but also for the people of local settlements. Since the end of the 18th century, the Church of Intercession had been considered to be a cathedral. The status changed in 1822, when Church of the Nativity of the Blessed Virgin Mary on the decree of the Holy Synod was declared cathedral.

St. Nicholas' Church in Bogdanov is one of only four churches in the Kamensky district of Rostov Oblast which have survived since the October Revolution. There is also Church of St. Nicholas in Elanskaya village.

St. George's Church in Sandata village was built in the early 20th century.

St. Catherine Church in Krasnodonetskaya (1879) and The Church of the Transfiguration of the Savior (1910) are officially declared as objects of cultural heritage of Russia.

Church of the Transfiguration (Olkhovchik) was built in 1873.

== Culture ==
=== Attractions ===
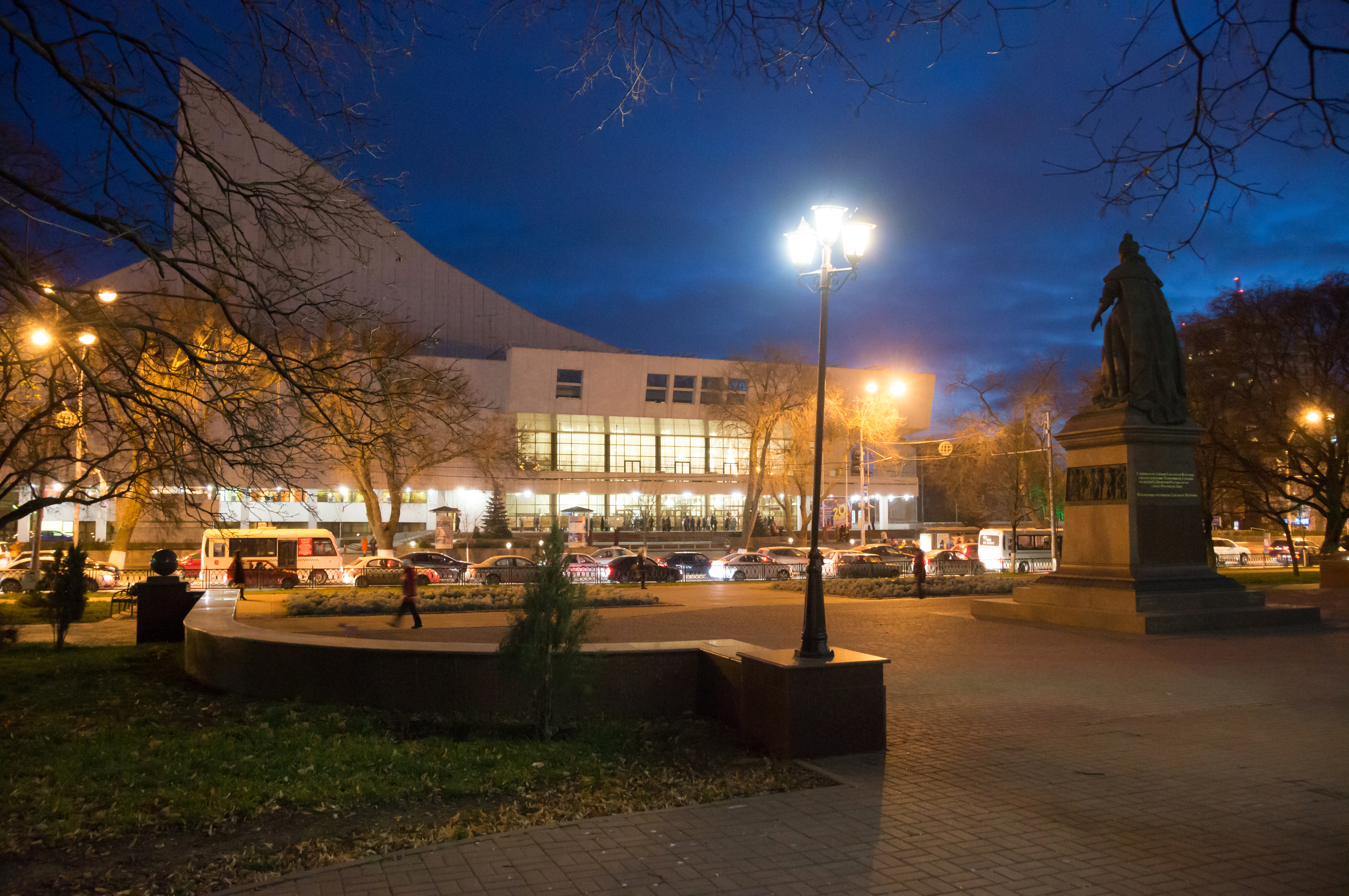
Rostov State Musical Theater

The region has 8,057 objects of archaeological heritage of federal importance. These include lower-Gnilovskaya, a settlement and a necropolis, fragments of the walls of the Genoese fortress of the 14th century, the archaeological Museum-reserve "Tanais", and many burial mounds and necropolises. Since 2002, the Rostov region has hosted the country's only races on tractors.

=== Theatres ===
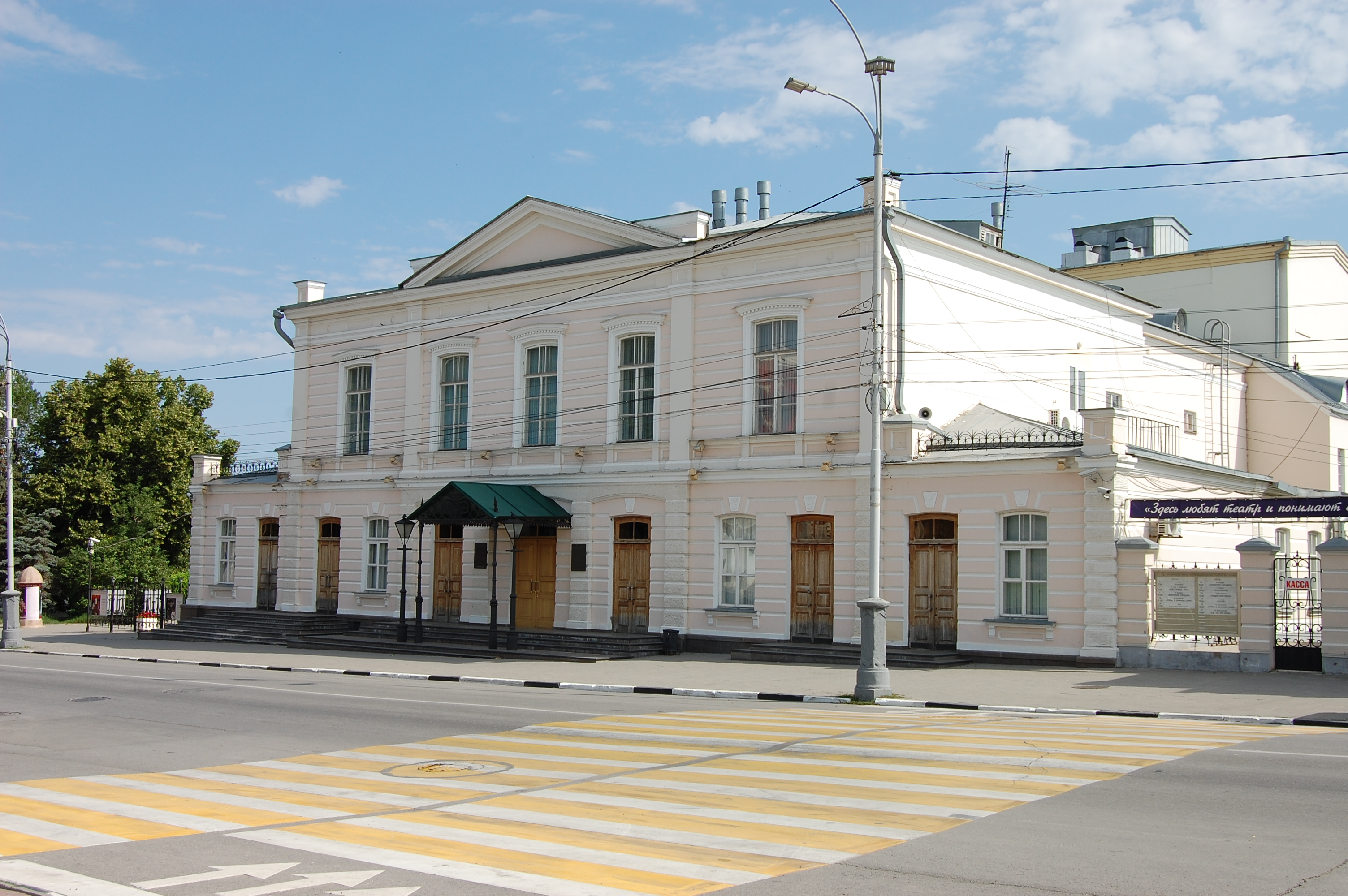
Taganrog Theatre

- Rostov academic drama theatre, named after Maxim Gorky.
- Rostov State Musical Theater. The theater opened in September 1999, and is the successor to the 1919 Rostov Musical Comedy Theater, one of the best operetta theaters in the Soviet Union.

The theater has two stages as well as a music and entertainment center, and hosts about 300 performances and concerts annually, as well as various forums and festivals. Its repertoire encompasses both musical traditions, as well as experiments in the field of contemporary art.

- Rostov state puppet theatre.
- Rostov regional academic youth theatre (former Rostov theatre for young spectators).
- Taganrog Theatre. The Taganrog Theater was established in 1827 by governor Alexander Dunaev. The theater was subsidized by the Taganrog's City Council since 1828, and its first director was Alexander Gor. The first group of Russian drama artists was directed by Perovsky and toured around the region, giving performances in Rostov on Don, Novocherkassk, Bahmut. The repertoire consisted mainly of dramas, melodramas and vaudevilles. In 1874, the Taganrog Municipality acquired the theater building by the purchase of its stocks.
- Don theatre of drama and Comedy V. F. Komissarzhevskaya (the Cossack drama theatre) Novocherkassk.
- Shakhty drama theatre, Shakhty.
- Novoshakhtinskiy drama theatre, Novoshakhtinsk.

=== Museums ===
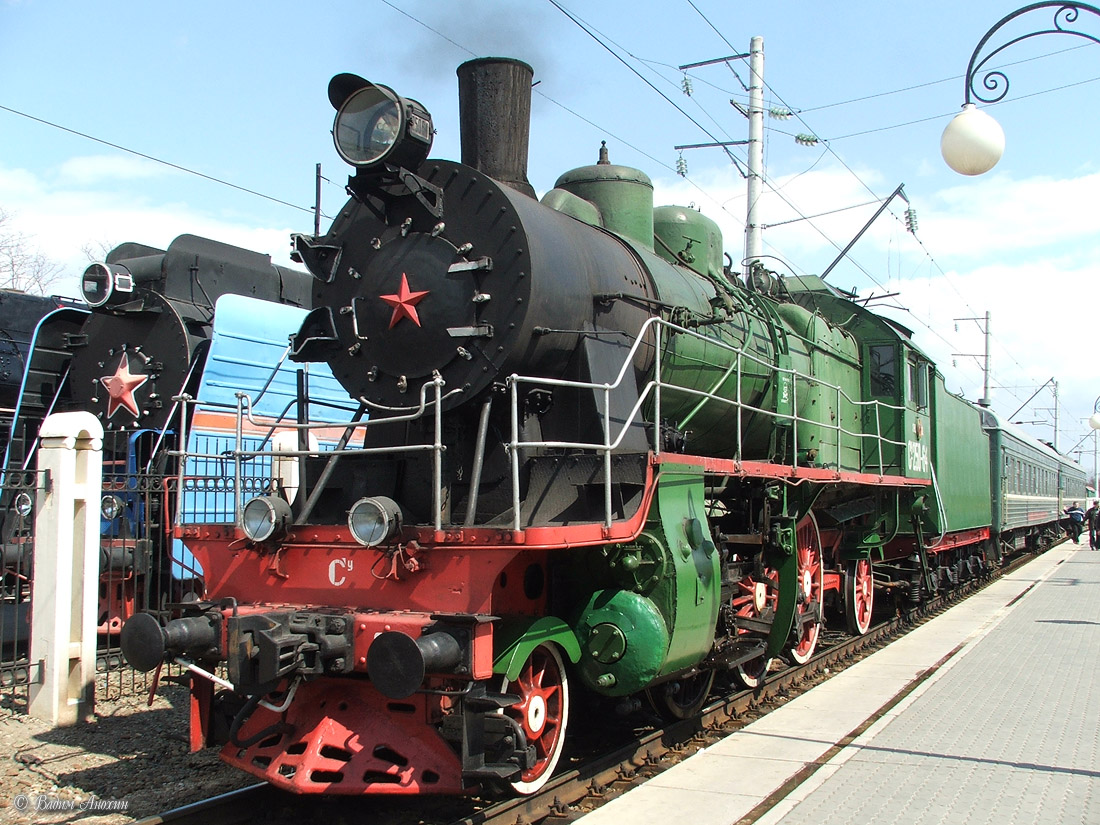
Soviet steam locomotive of class С^{у} in the display area

==== In Rostov-on-Don ====
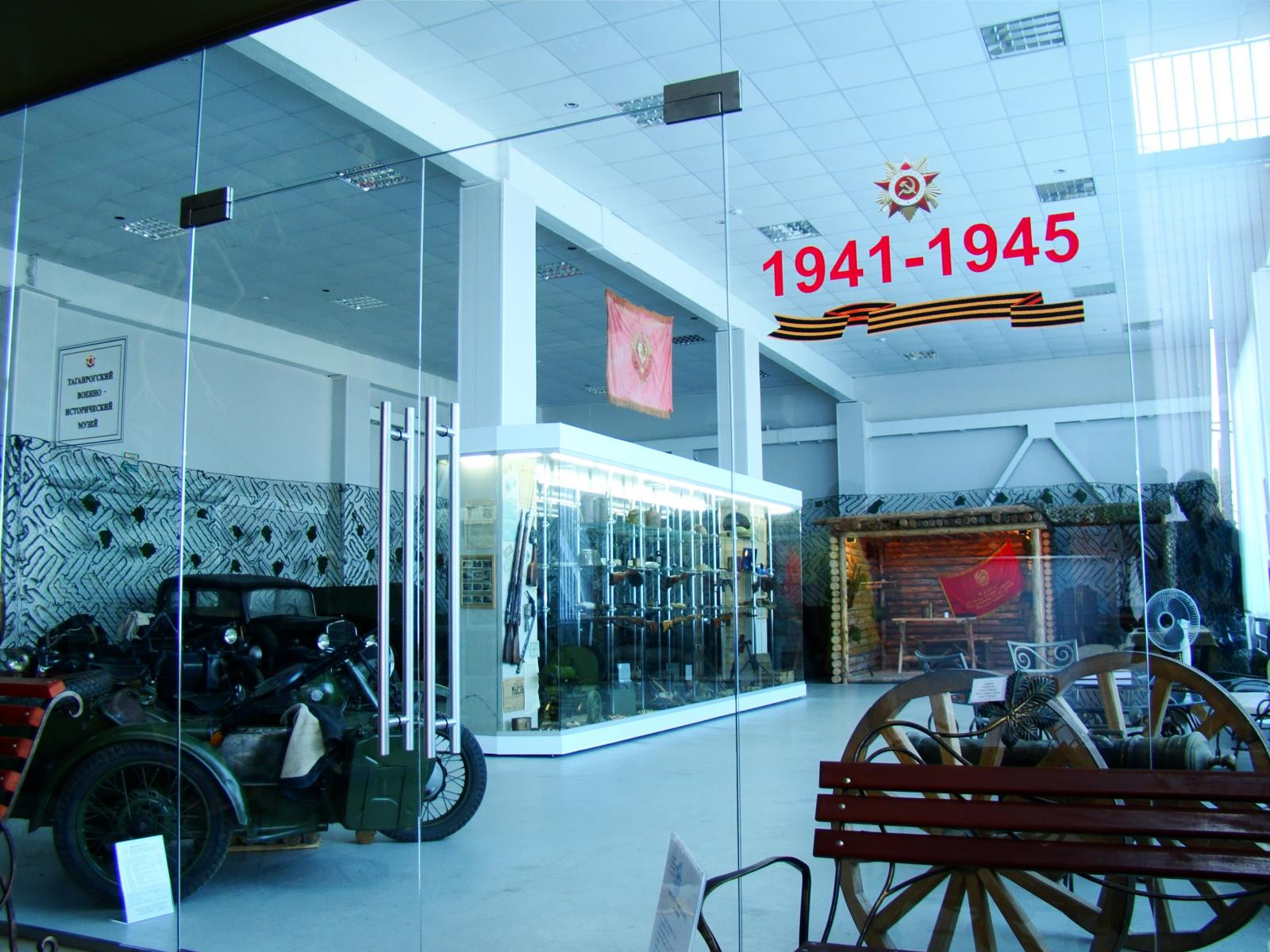
Taganrog military museum

- Center for Contemporary Art "Tobacco Factory".
- Rostov Regional Museum of Local History.
- Rostov Regional Museum of Fine Arts.
- Museum of Contemporary Art at Dmitrovskaya.
- Museum of Russian-Armenian Friendship.
- Museum of North Caucasus Railway. The first museum of history of North Caucasus Railway opened on 4 November 1960 in a Community Center of railwaymen at Rostov-Glavny station. Permanent exposition includes: information boards about famous North Caucasus railwaymen, model trains on a scale 1:15, uniform, cases, panoramas, implements of various times. The exhibition covers the period from emergence of rail transport in the region up to the present moment. The various collections from the Russian Civil War and the Great Patriotic War, now exceed 12,000 objects in the main fund.

==== In other cities of the region ====
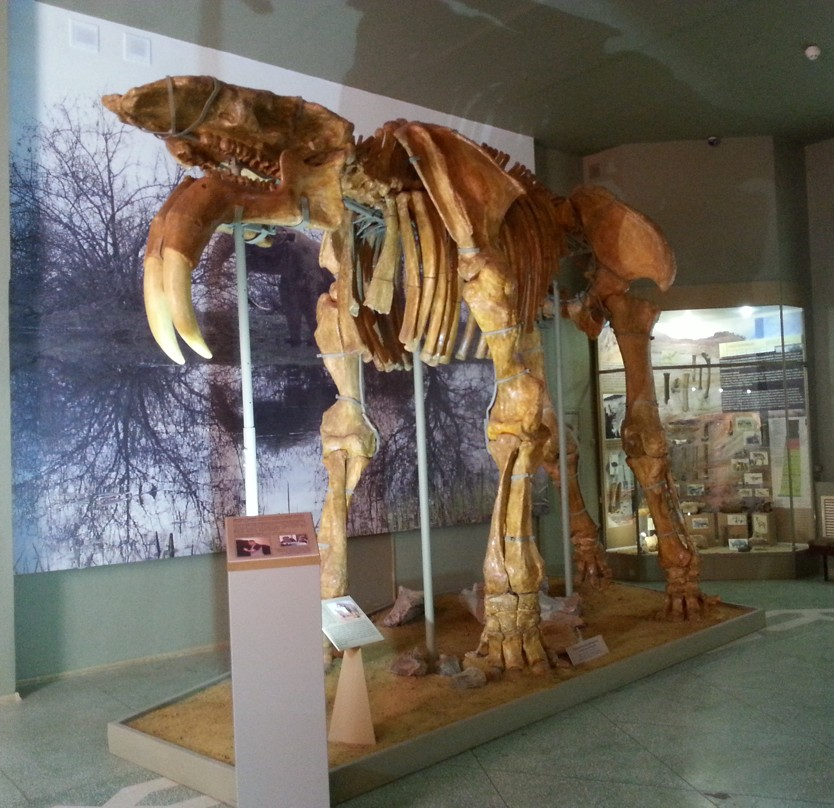
Deinotherium skeleton in one of the rooms.

- Aksai Military History Museum, Aksay.
- Archaeological museum-reserve "Tanais", Nedvigovka.
- Azov Museum of History, Archaeology and Palaeontology, Azov. The bulk of the museum is located in the three-story building erected in 1892 which belonged to the former town council, there are 22 rooms. The symbol of the museum is the skeleton of a Trogontherium mammoth that existed 800-600 thousand years ago in the interglacial period. This is the world's unique skeleton with the whole skull. The museum's areas: permanent exhibitions – 2852 m^{2}, temporary exhibitions – 580 m^{2}, storage facilities – 1896 m^{2}, park (open air) – 7.13 hectares.
- Bataysk Museum of History, Bataysk.
- Gukovo Museum of Mining Work, Gukovo.
- House-Museum of S. Budyonny, Stan. Budennovskaya.
- Novocherkassk Museum of the History of the Don Cossacks, Novocherkassk.
- Razdorsk Ethnographic Museum-Reserve, the camp. Razdorskaya.
- Salsk Art Museum named after People's Artist VK Nechitailo, Salsk.
- Shakhty Museum of Local History, Shakhty.
- Taganrog military museum, Taganrog. The start of museum exhibition creation refers to May 9, 2004, when the club Auto-Retro Taganrog was founded. Subsequently, several vehicle units were purchased and repaired. In 2008, club activity concept got military direction. On May 6, 2010, permanent exhibition consisting of several thousands of exhibits was opened. In July 2012, the name Taganrog military museum got official status.
- The State Museum-Reserve of MA Sholokhov, St. Veshenskaya.
- Volgodonsk Art Museum, Volgodonsk.
- Volgodonsk Ecological and Historical Museum, Volgodonsk.

== Economy ==
Major industries of Rostov Oblast are agriculture, agricultural industry, food processing, heavy industry, coal mining and automobile manufacture.

The largest companies in the region include Novoshakhtinsk Petrochemical Plant, Gloria Jeans Corp., Rostvertol, Oil-extracting factory "Yug Rusi", North Caucasian Railway.

In the Rostov Region in 1989, the first commercial bank in Southern Russia, Rostovsoсbank, was created on the basis of the regional division of the Zhilsotsbank USSR. The bank existed from 1989 to 1998, with four branches operating in Rostov-on-Don. In addition, the bank had branches in the cities of Taganrog, Shakhty, Gukovo and Donetsk. In 1998 Rostovsotsbank lost solvency, but was able to ensure full repayment of deposits to all depositors before the establishment of the Deposit Insurance System, even before the revocation of the banking license.

From 1999 to 2010, one of the largest banks in Southern Russia was Donskoy Narodny Bank (Don People's Bank), located in Rostov-on-Don.

As of 2022, there are 7 regional credit organizations and 21 bank branches operating in Rostov Oblast. The leading positions are taken by Sberbank, VTB, Alfa-Bank, Rosbank, Center-Invest and Fora-Bank.

== Gallery ==
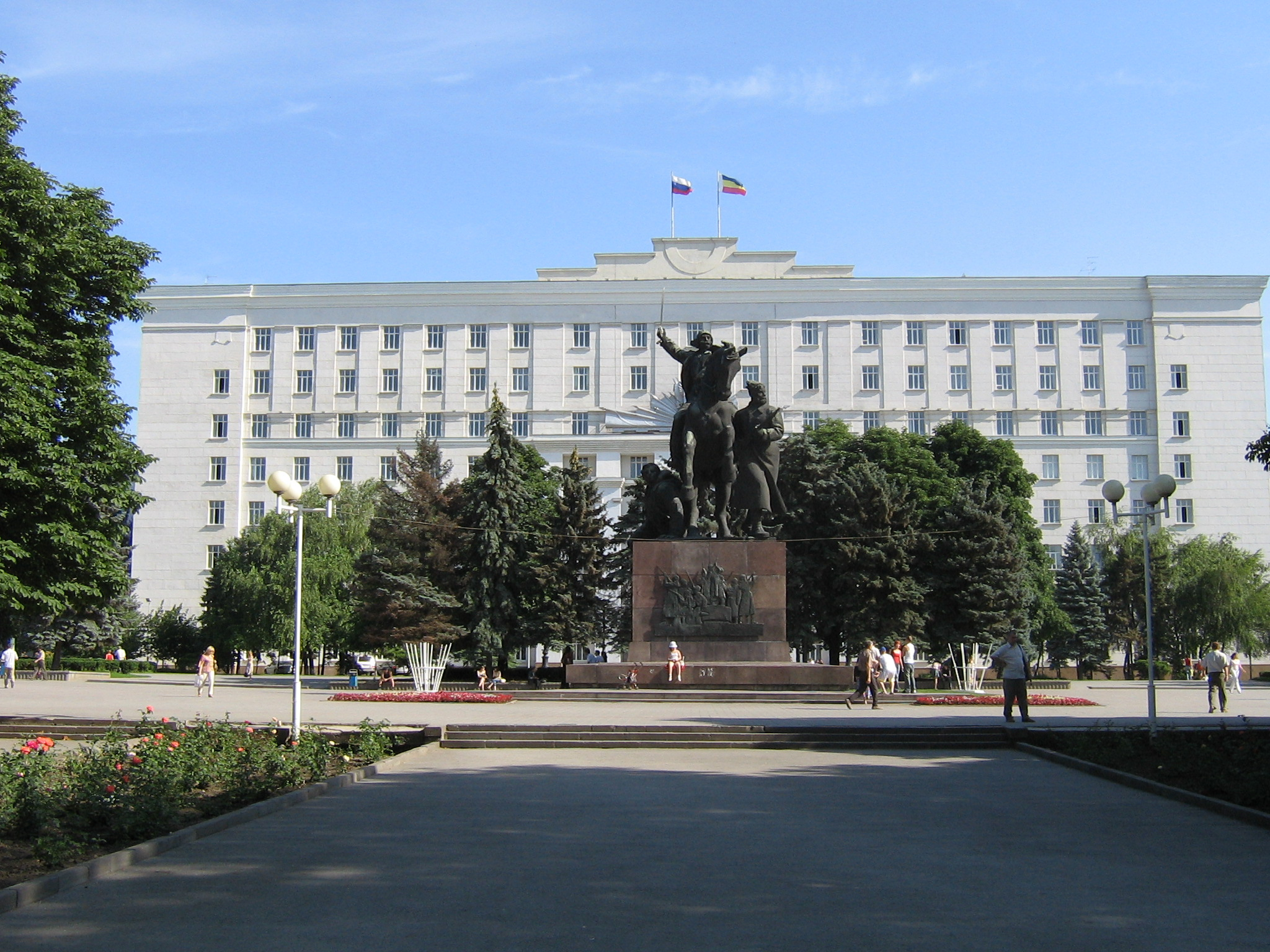
Rostov Oblast Government building

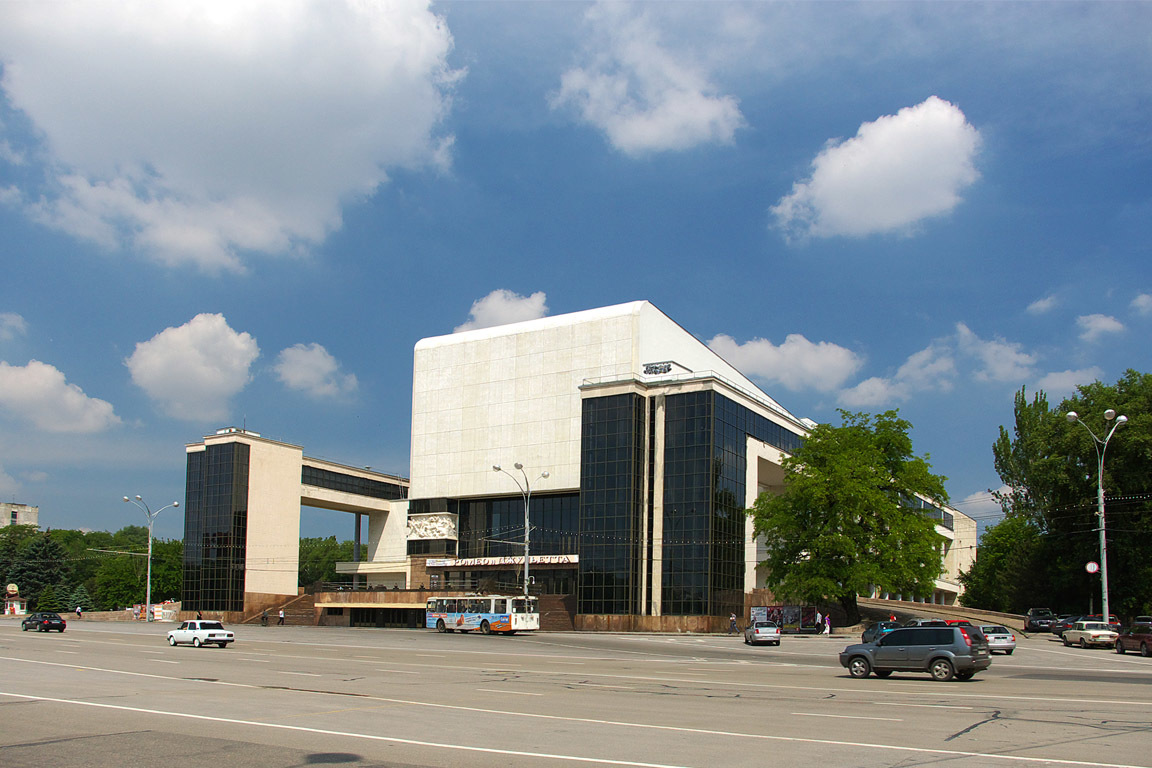
Rostov Academic Drama Theatre named after Maxim Gorky

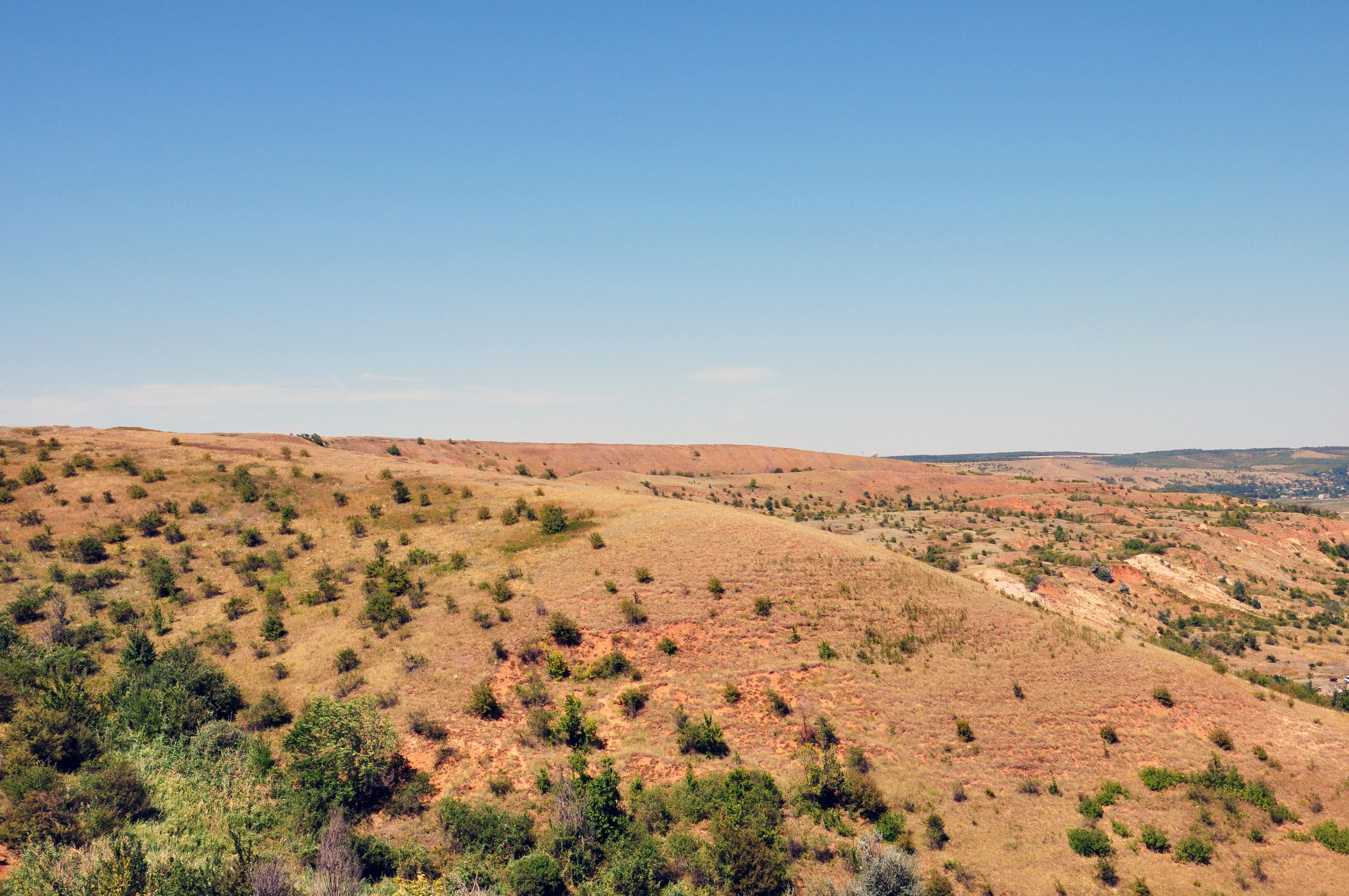
Steppe of the Rostov Oblast in the Ust-Donetsky District belongs to the Pontic-Caspian steppe

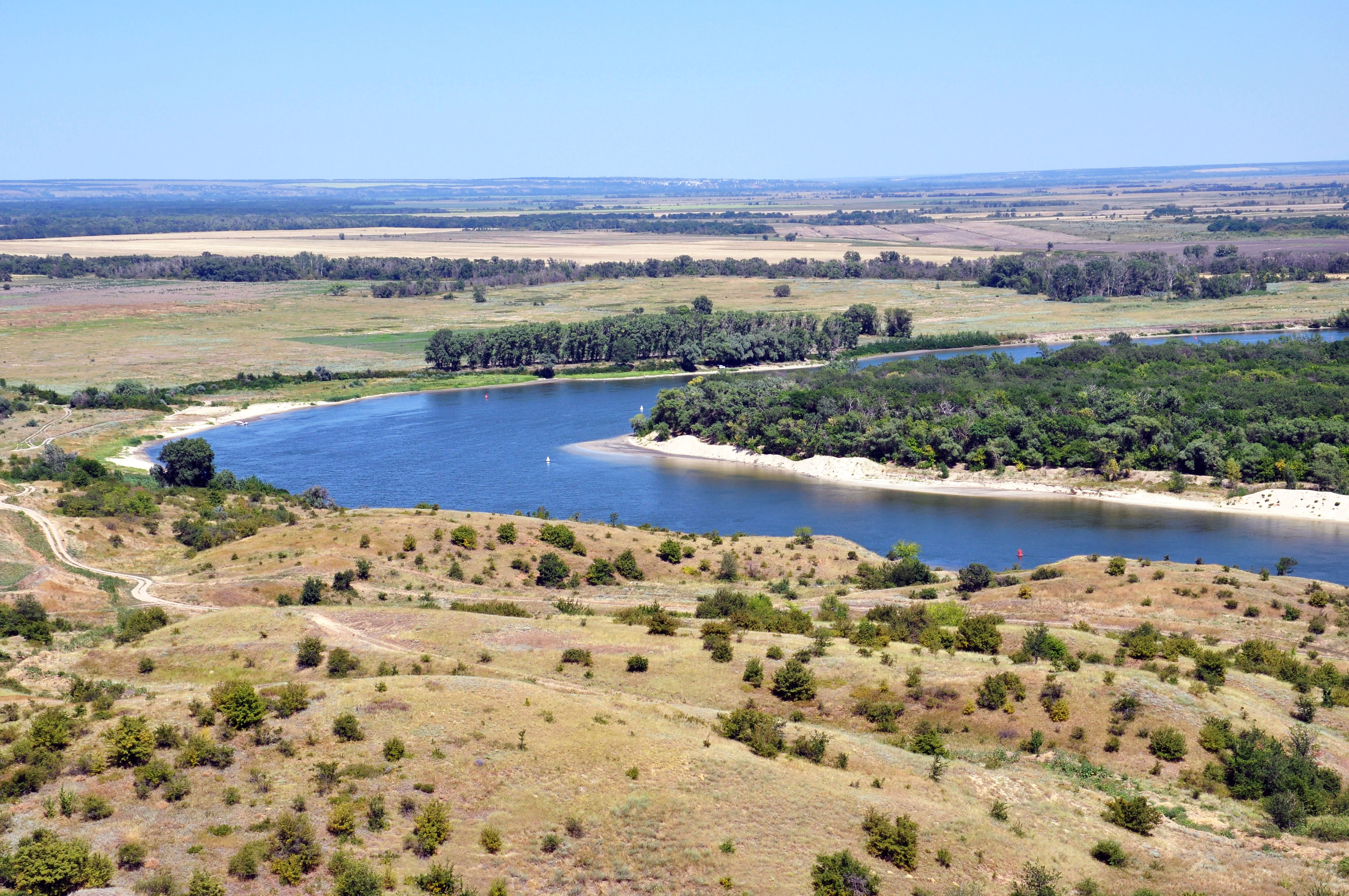
Forest-steppe in Rostov Oblast

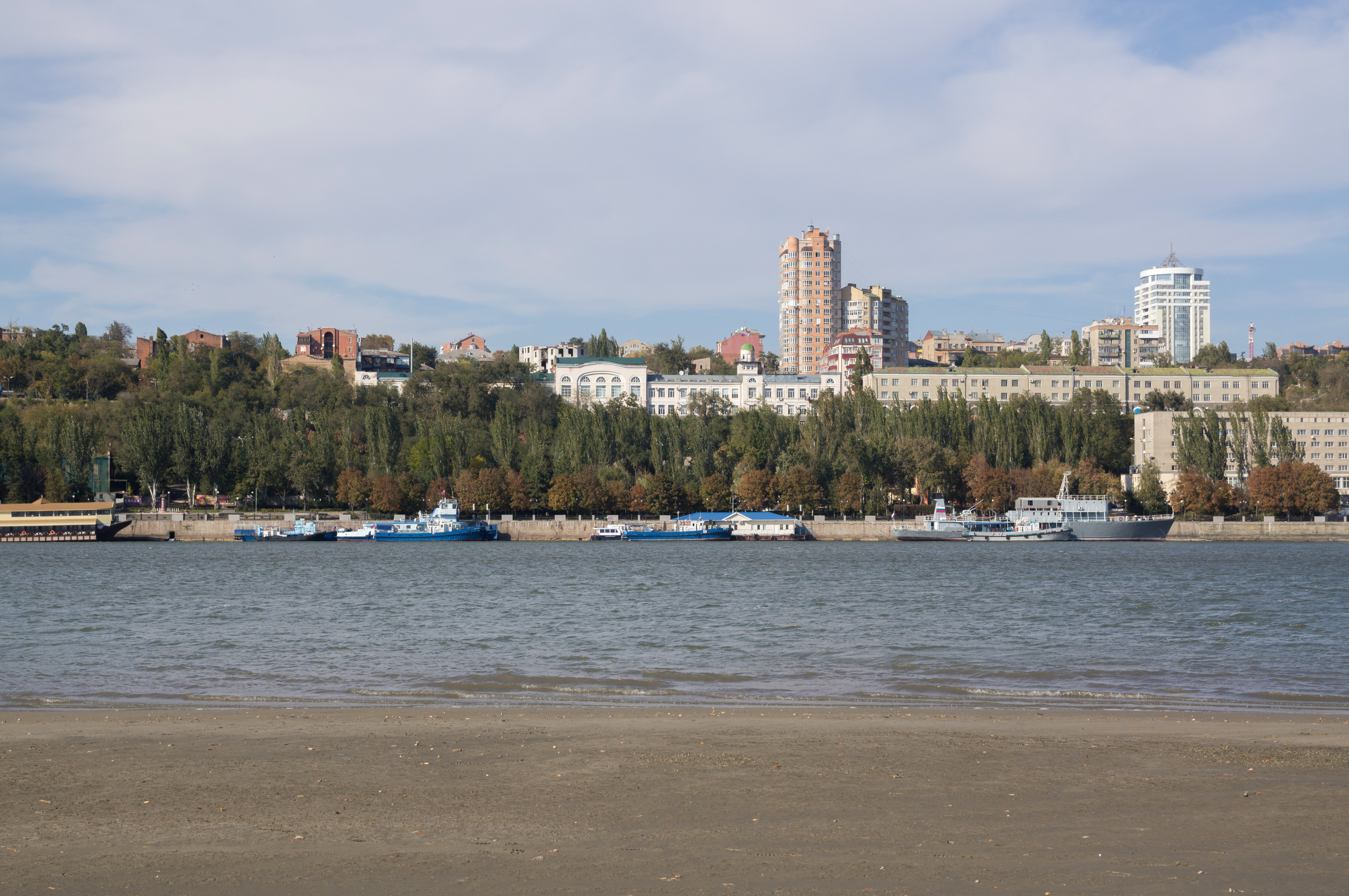
Don River in summer, Rostov-on-Don

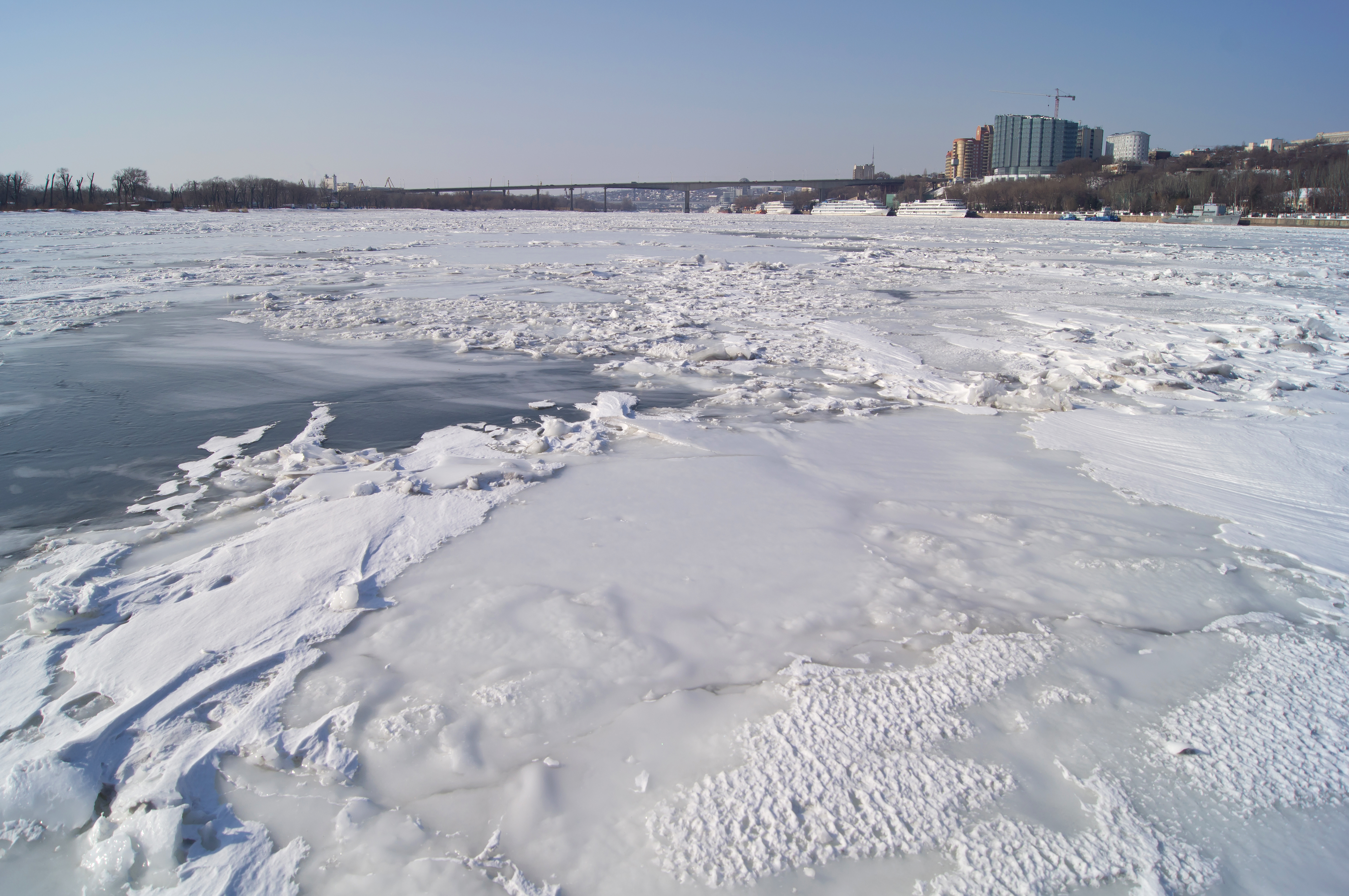
Frozen Don River in winter, Rostov-on-Don

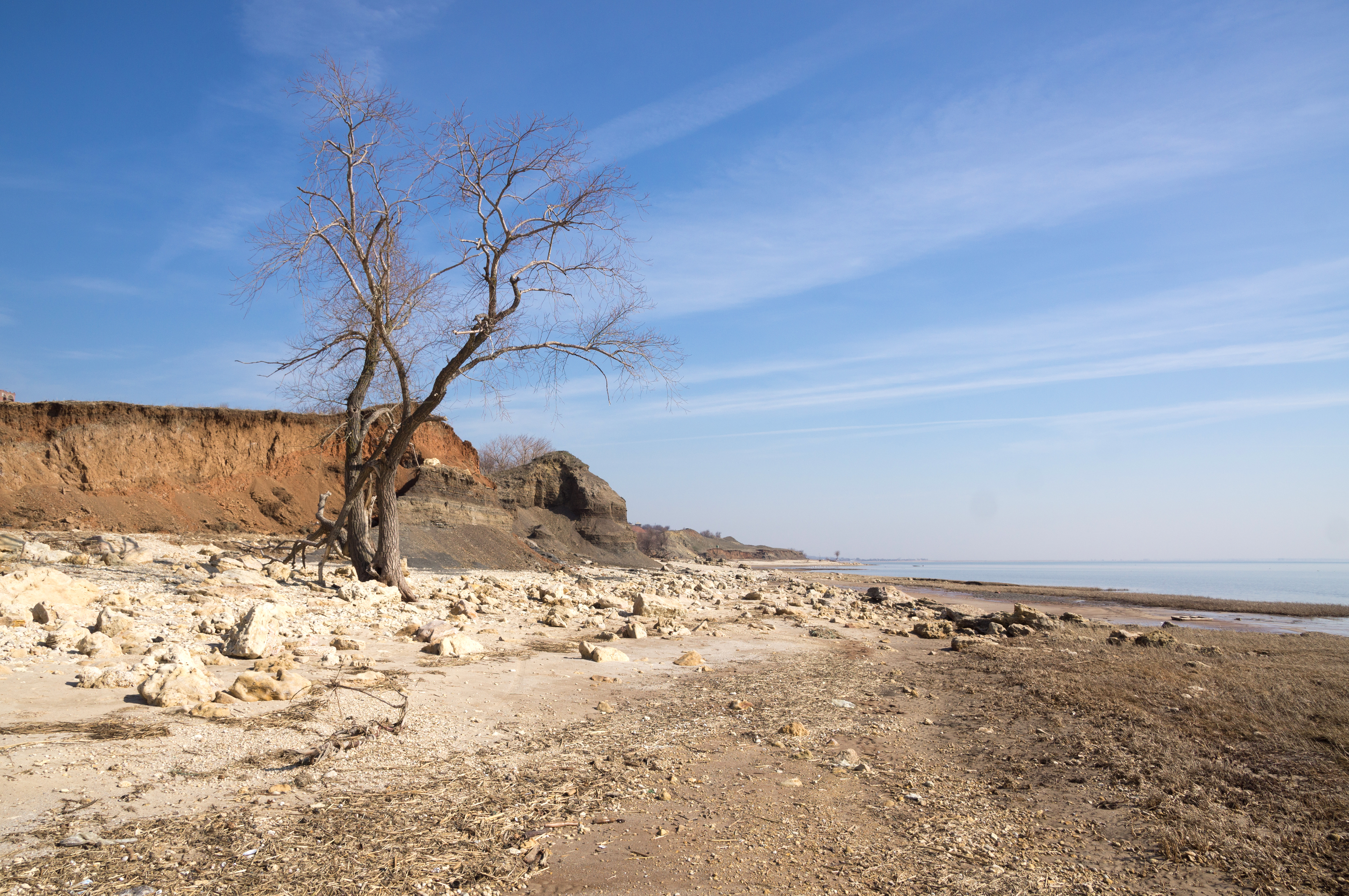
The coast of the Sea of Azov in Taganrog Bay

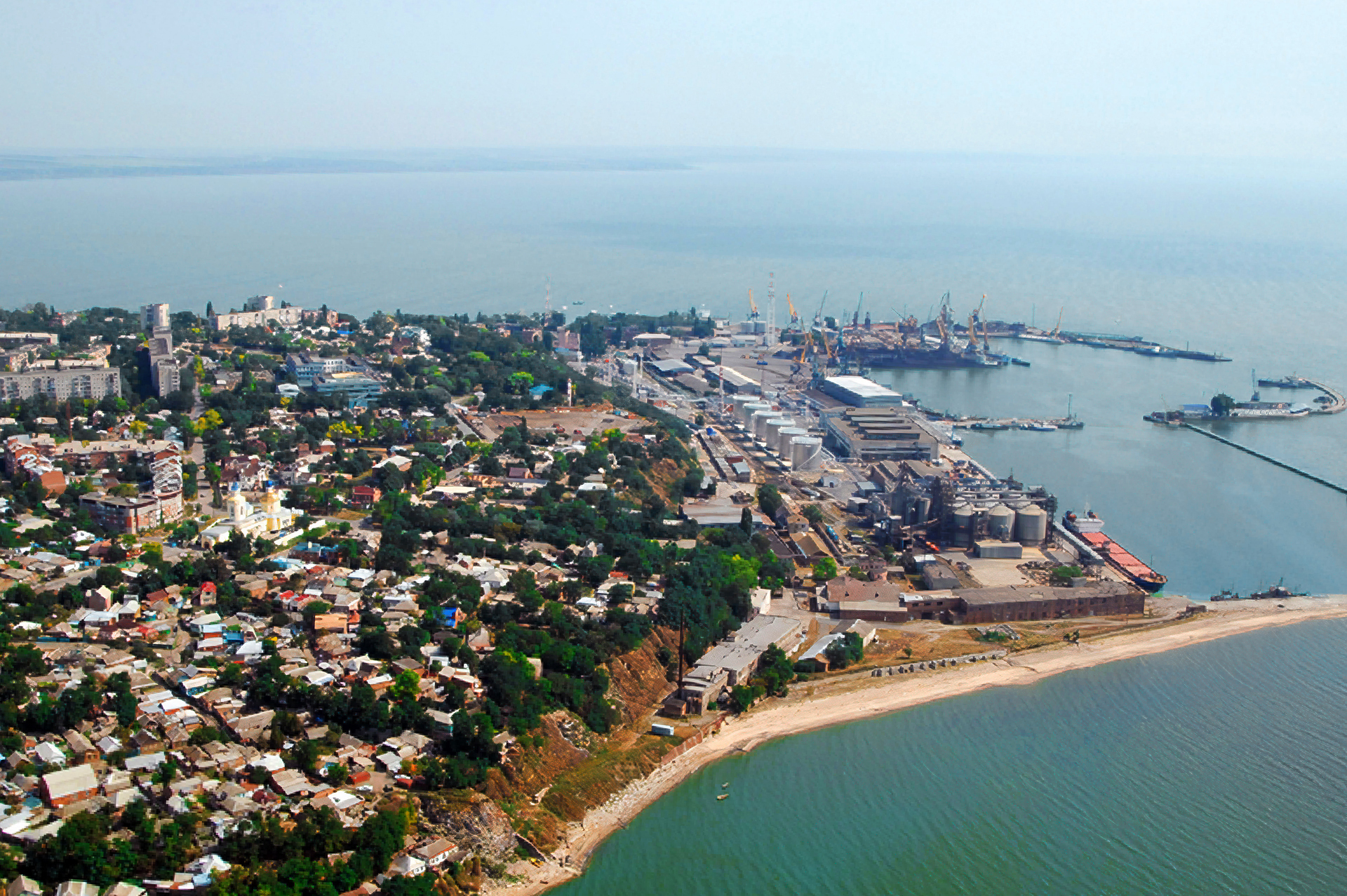
The Port of Taganrog

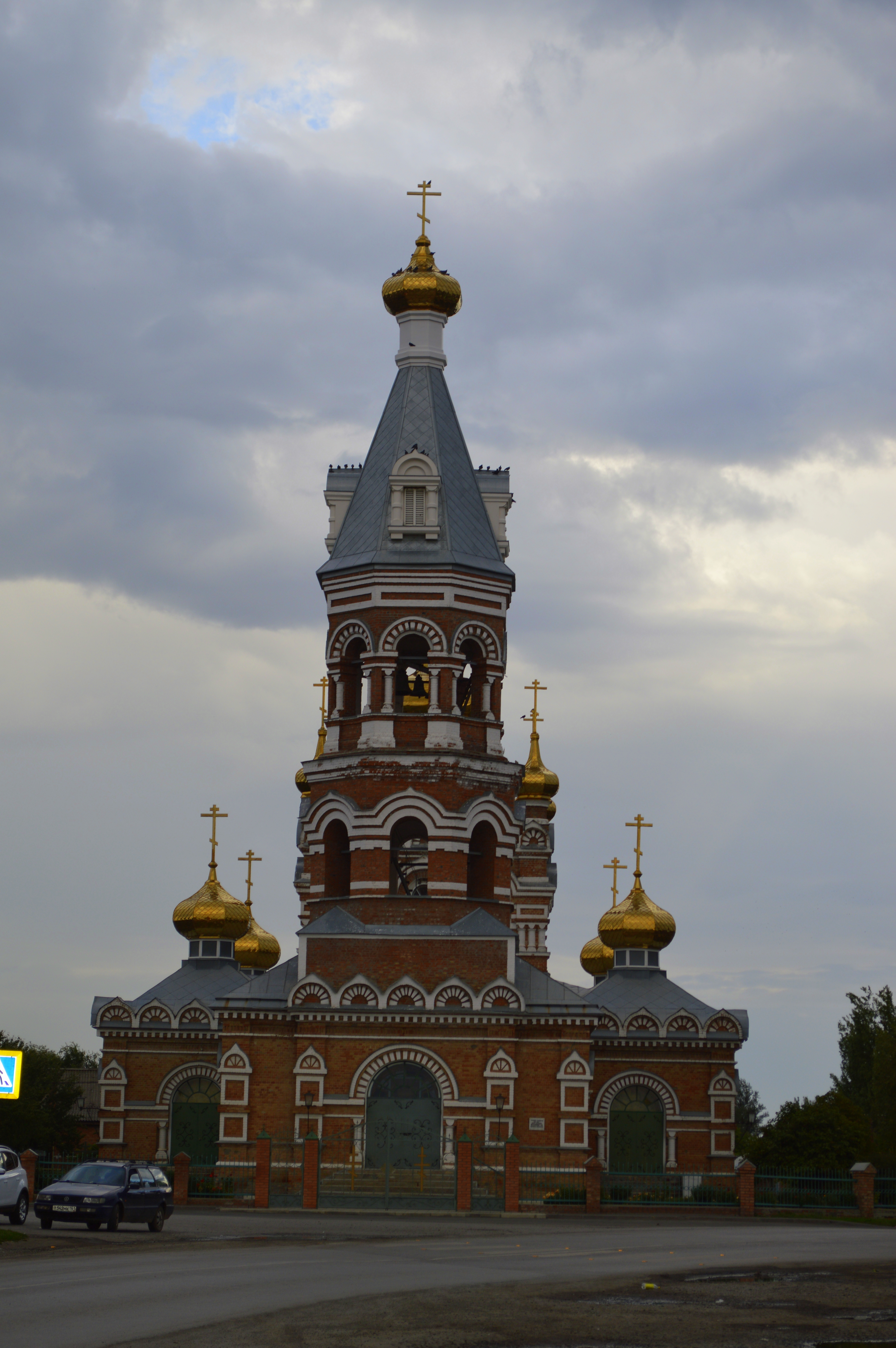
Holy Trinity Church, Bolshaya Martynovka

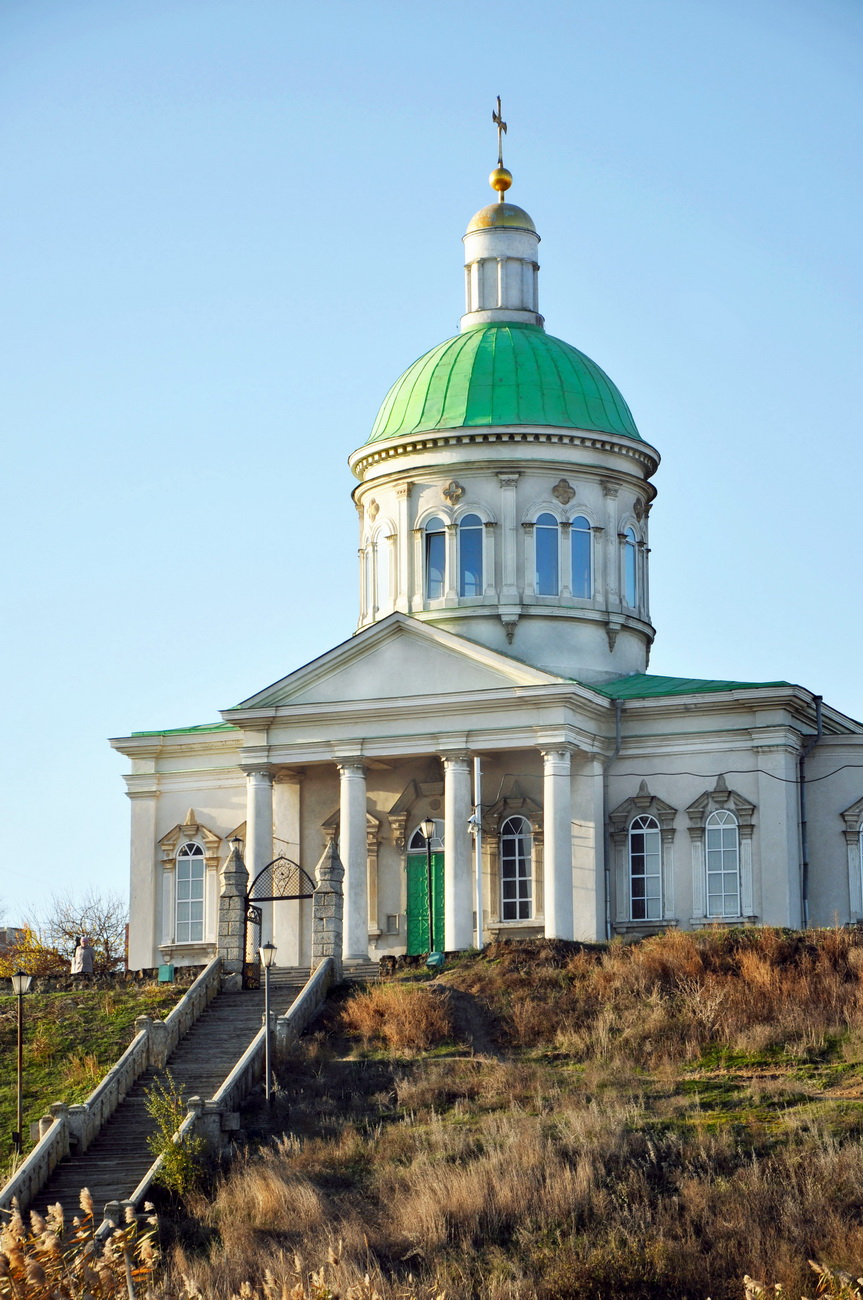
Armenian Church (1792) in Nakhichevan-on-Don

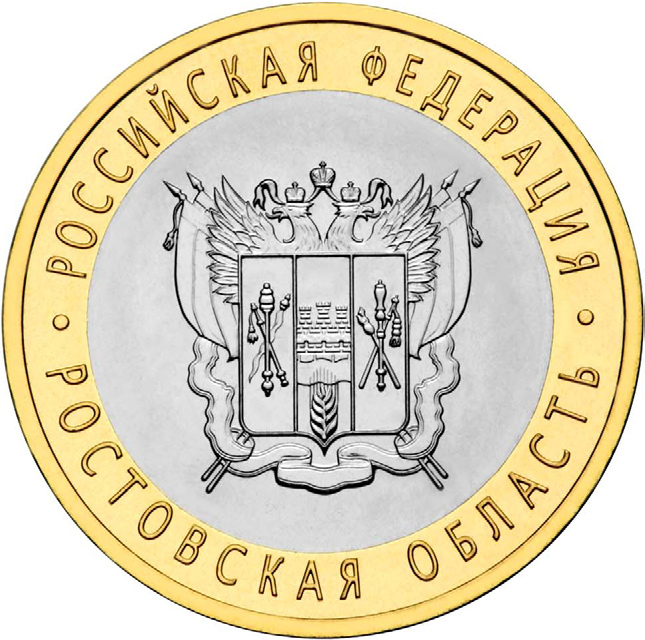
Reverse side of 2007 commemorative coin
