= Holy Trinity Church, Bolshaya Martynovka =

Russian Orthodox church

Holy Trinity Church
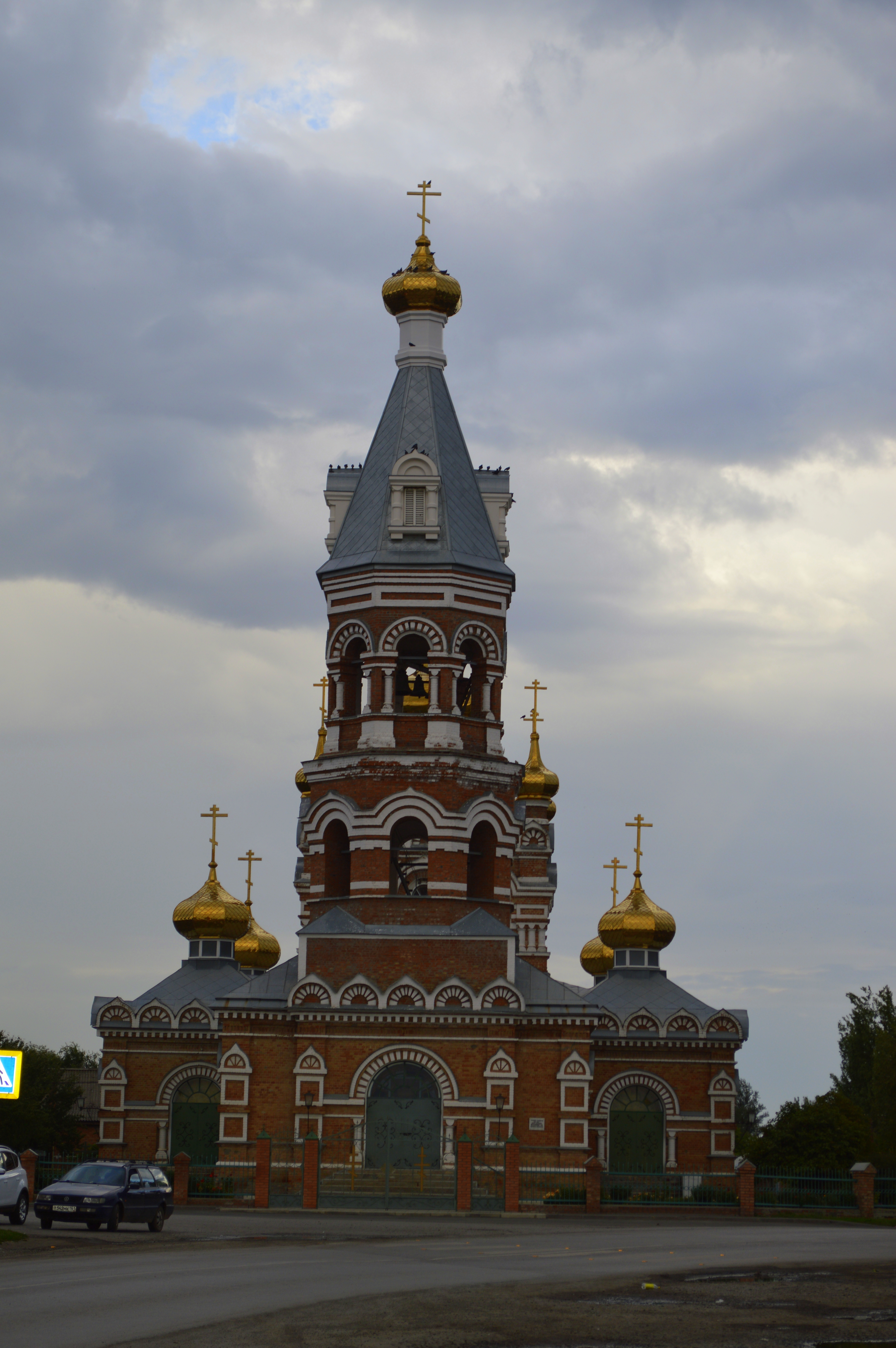

Religion
- Affiliation: Russian Orthodox

Location
- Location: Bolshaya Martynovka, Rostov Oblast, Russia
- Interactive map of Holy Trinity Church

Architecture
- Architect: Avraam Melnikov
- Completed: 1904

Holy Trinity Church (Russian: Свято-Троицкий Храм в Большой Мартыновке) is a Russian Orthodox church in the village of Bolshaya Martynovka, Rostov Oblast, Russia. It belongs to the Diocese of Volgodonsk and Salsk. It was built in 1904 in Pseudo-Russian style. This is the only church in Russia constructed in honour of coronation of Emperor Nicholas II.

The church possesses particles of relics of Matrona of Moscow and Paul of Taganrog. The church is visited mostly by locals rather than tourists due to the low level of infrastructure development in the village.

== History ==
The first Holy Trinity Church in Bolshaya Martynovka was built of wood in 1799. Money for the construction were donated by Major General Dmitry Martynovich Martynov. At the church there was a chapel in memory of death of Alexander II.

In 1895 parochial custody council decided to construct a new church on the site of Holy Trinity Church.

The construction place was consecrated on May 26, 1896, the day of the coronation of Nicholas II. The first stone was laid on the following day.

The funds for construction donated by village dwellers were not sufficient, so in 1900 the parish assembly decided to seek support from the Diocese and requested for the opening of fundraising. In the same year the construction works were launched on the project of architect Avraam Melnikov, who had drafted it a few decades earlier. The main construction works were finished in 1904.

Local dwellers say that during these times Feodor Chaliapin sang with the church choir.

There are three aisles in the church: the main one is consecrated in the name of the Holy Trinity, the right one ― in the name of Alexandra of Rome, and the left one ― in the name of St. Nicholas.

In 1930 the church was closed, and its building was first housed a granary, and then as a tractor station. The paintings were covered with plaster, the iconostasis was destroyed, the bells were thrown away. In 1945 the church was handed over to believers community, but only partially: 4/5 of its area still housed a granary. That caused great inconvenience for the parishioners, yet all requests from Rostov diocesan administration to free the building were ignored by authorities.

In 1963, the church was closed again.

In 1991 the church building was exempted from the warehouse and worship services began to be held there. Restoration works were carried out during the following years.
