= Church of St. Nicholas (Elanskaya) =

Church in Rostov Oblast, Russia

Church of Saint Nicholas
- Russian: Церковь Николая Чудотворца
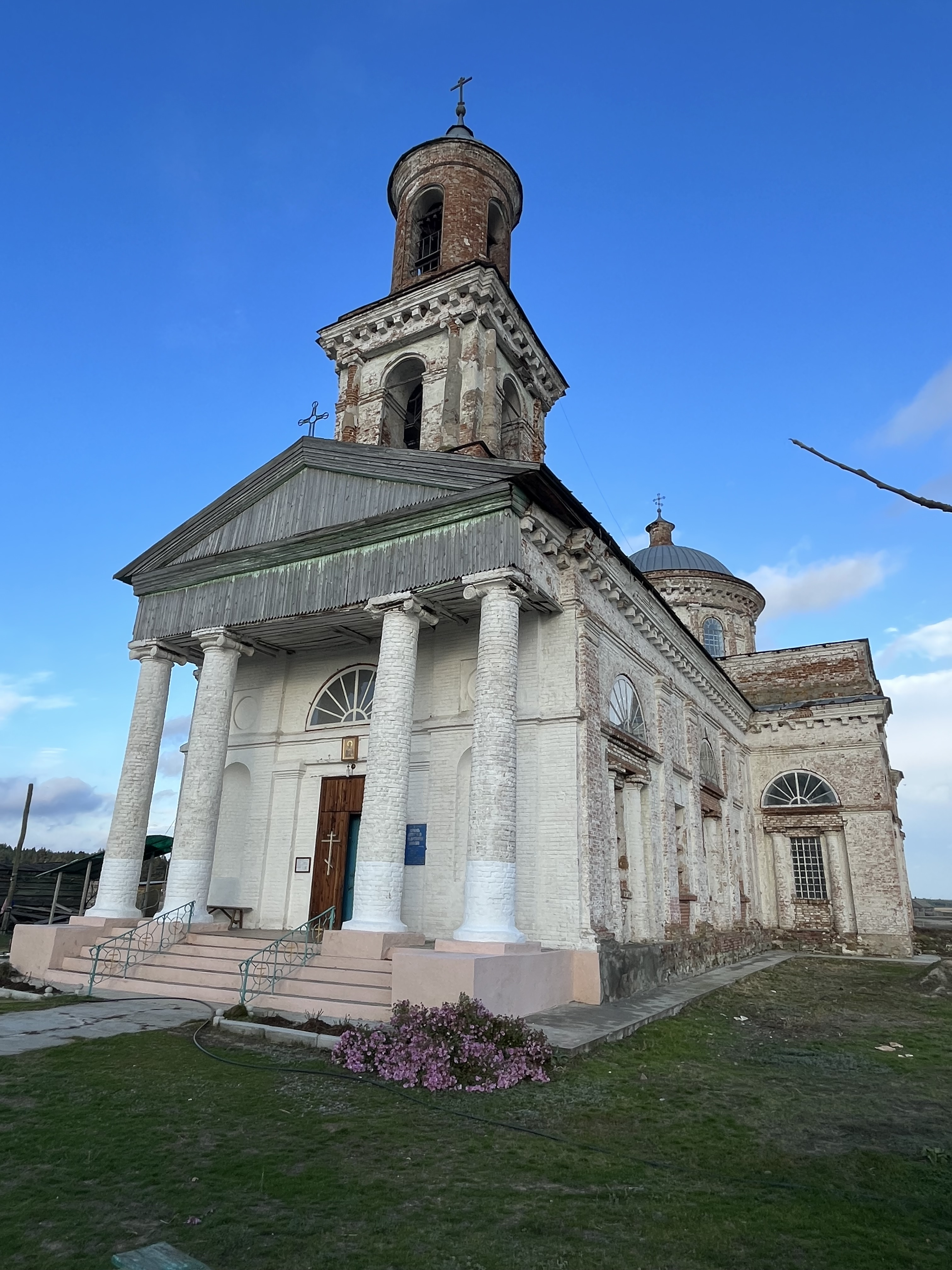
- Church of Saint Nicholas in 2023
- Church of Saint Nicholas
- Location: Elanskaya village, Sholokhovsky District, Rostov Oblast, Russia
- Country: Russia
- Denomination: Russian Orthodox Church

History
- Status: Saint Nicholas
- Dedication: Paraskeva Pyatnitsa

Architecture
- Style: Classicst
- Completed: 1826

The Church of Saint Nicholas (Russian: Церковь Николая Чудотворца) is a Russian Orthodox church in Elanskaya village, Sholokhovsky District, Rostov Oblast, Russia. It belongs to the Diocese of Shakhty of Russian Orthodox Church.

== History ==
A wooden chapel was built here before 1730, when the Elanskaya village was moved to a new place (part of the Veshenians moved from an overpopulated Veshensky khutor to another place of residence, having founded a new settlement). So the chapel was also transferred here and later was rebuilt as the Church of St. Nicholas the Wonderworker. By 1757, the dilapidated church was replaced with a new, also wooden one.

Over time, number grew on and the small wooden church could no longer accommodate all the parishioners. Therefore, it was decided to build a new stone church. Construction of the building was started in 1823 in honor of victory over Napoleon in 1812, and was finished in 1826. It was built on the project of architect Ivan Starov in Classicist style.

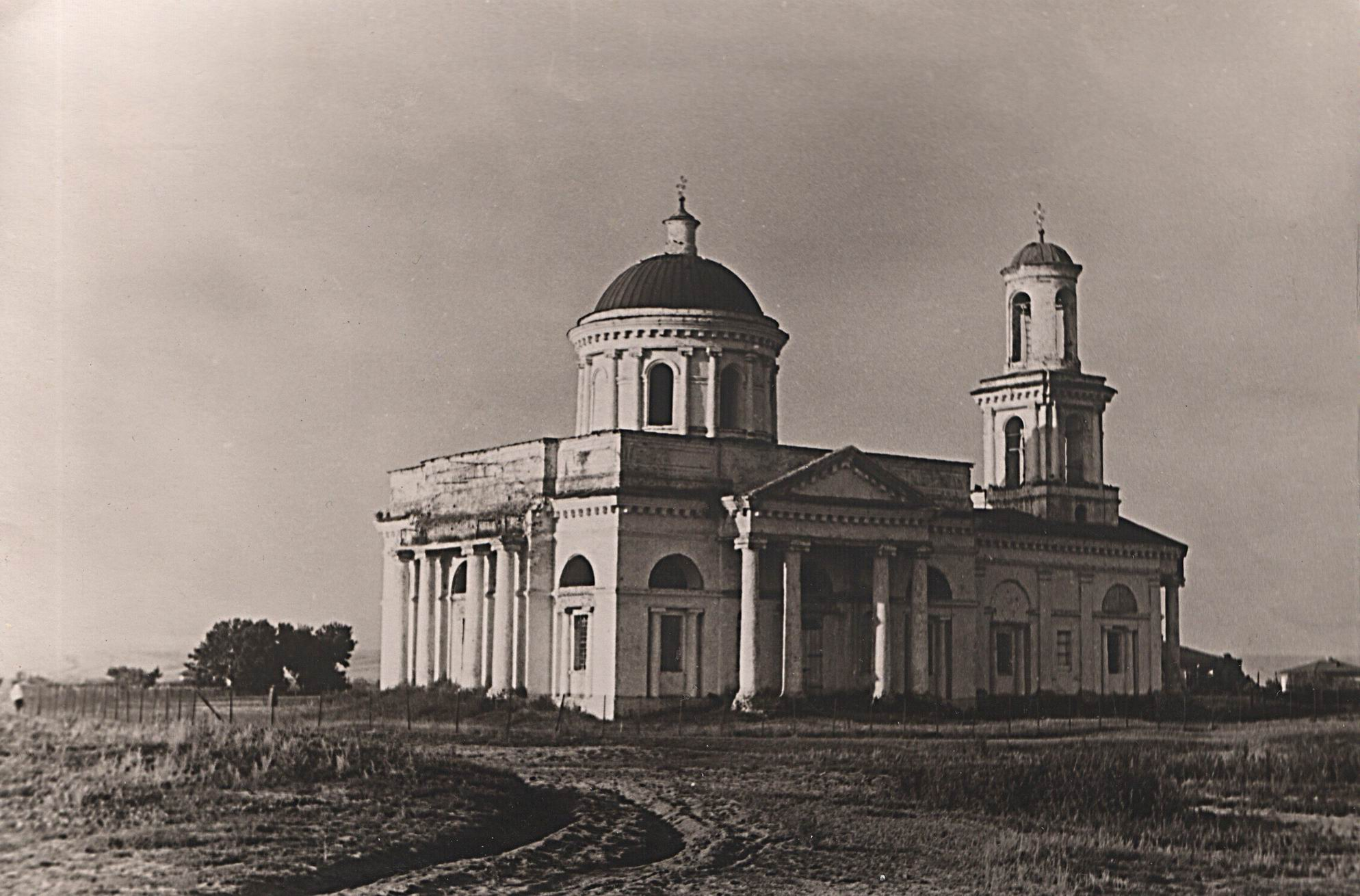
The church in 1920s

In 1930s, the church was destroyed and closed. The bell was broken into pieces and taken to the remelting, the capital fence was dismantled. The church building itself was used as a grain warehouse. The priest, Father Athanasius, was arrested, and his fate is still unknown.

During World War II, soldiers of Red Army were quartered here, and later in the building were held captive Italians.

The village of Elanskaya was not occupied by German forces during the war, but was constantly shelled by them. One of the shells once fell onto the church, but it stood still.

In 1990s the church was renovated on the funds of local dwellers. Today a museum is functioning at its place.
