= St. Catherine Church, Krasnodonetskaya =

Church in Rostov Oblast, Russia

St. Catherine Church
- Екатерининская церковь
- St. Catherine Church
- 48°01′30″N 40°54′28″E
- Location: Krasnodonetskaya stanitsa, Belokalitvinsky District, Rostov Oblast, Russia
- Country: Russia
- Denomination: Russian Orthodox

History
- Status: Parish church

Architecture
- Completed: 1879

Administration
- Diocese: Diocese of Volgodonsk

The Church of Saint Catherine (Russian: Церковь Святой Екатерины, Екатерининская церковь) is a Russian Orthodox church in Krasnodonetskaya stanitsa, Belokalitvinsky District, Rostov Oblast, Russia, that belongs to the Diocese of Volgodnosk and was built in 1879. It is officially declared as object of cultural heritage of Russia of Regional significance.

== History ==
Katerininskaya (now Krasnodonetskaya stanitsa) was founded in 1775 by the decree of Catherine II. The founder of the village was Prince Grigory Alexandrovich Potemkin. Initially it was situated on the low bank of Donets. The place was chosen unsuccessfully and in spring the village was flooded, so later it was decided to move it downstream. There was built the wooden Church of St. Catherine. Exclusively for the Church of St. Catherine was painted icon of St. Catherine of Alexandria, and the picture had a great resemblance to the Empress Catherine II. In 1835, the village was moved higher to the hills, in 1840 the church was moved there as well and was set on a stone foundation.

In 1877, this church completely burned out, and in 1879 a new one was built, with two chapels: the southern one was consecrated in the name of the Ascension of the Lord and the northern one in the name of Saint Pantaleon. The church was surrounded by a stone fence with wooden bars. The building was constructed of wood, which is not typical for the steppe Southern Russia. Local residents claim that the material for the church were crafted in Siberia, and the logs were numbered and transported to the village from there. In 1886, a parish school was built at the church. Since 1906, the church-parish guardianship began to function.

In 1920, Katerininskaya village was renamed Krasnodonetskaya. In 1930–1940 the church was closed. The domes of the church, both in the main building and the bell tower were cut off. The church was used as a granary. Before the beginning of German occupation, Soviet authorities decided to blow up the church so that the Nazis would not get the grain, but local residents quickly took the grain bags to their homes and so there was no need to blow up any more. During the fighting in the village the church had not been damaged. When the Germans occupied Krasnodonetskya, the church was briefly open again. After the war, the church was closed again.

It was locked and stood empty until the mid-1980s and was opened only in 1985. From the modern history of this church, it is known that scenes from two Soviet films—"Ataman" and "Dina"—were shot on its background.

The Saint Catherine's Church is one of the two remaining churches that are declared as monuments of wooden architecture in the Seversky Donets Basin and objects of cultural heritage of Regional significance.
