= Museum of North Caucasus Railway =

Railway museum in Rostov-on-Don, Rostov, Russia

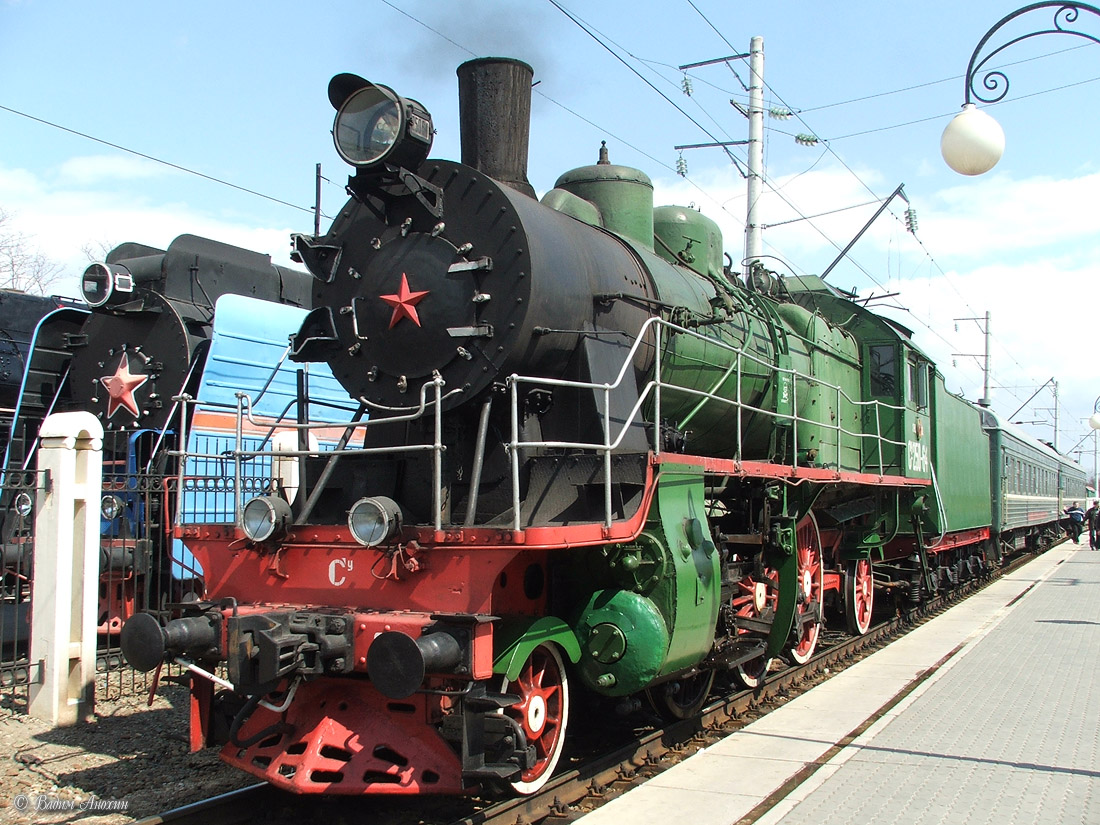
- Soviet steam locomotive class S^{u} in the display area

- Location within Russia
- Established: 1 August 2003
- Location: Rostov-on-Don, Russia
- Coordinates: 47.219700°N 39.685400°E
- Type: Railway museum
- Public transit access: Glubokaya halt

The Museum of North Caucasus Railway (Russian: Музей Северо-Кавказской железной дороги, Muzyey Severo-Kavkazskoy zheleznoy dorogi) is a railway museum in Rostov-on-Don, Rostov oblast, Russia, which opened on 1 August 2003. It consists of a room in a community center of railwaymen and a display area 12,400 m^{2} at Glubokaya halt on the south-west outskirts of Rostov-on-Don.

The first museum of the history of the North Caucasus Railway opened on 4 November 1960 in a community center of railwaymen at Rostov-Glavny station. Permanent expositions include information boards about famous North Caucasus railwaymen, model trains on a scale 1:15, uniforms, cases, panoramas and implements from various time periods. The exhibition covers the period from the emergence of rail transport in the region up to the present moment. The various collections from the Russian Civil War and the Great Patriotic War, now exceed 12,000 objects in the main fund.

The display area at Glubokaya halt opened on 1 August 2003, which marked celebrations of Railwayman's Day. Historical rolling stock (60 locomotives and carriages) is exhibiting here. 19 locomotives and carriages are located at Rostov-Zapadny station. A lot of steam locomotives in the museum are in good condition. This rolling stock participates in historical reconstructions, filmings and celebratory parades. The total length of the exhibition tracks is 1.9 km.

== Exhibits ==
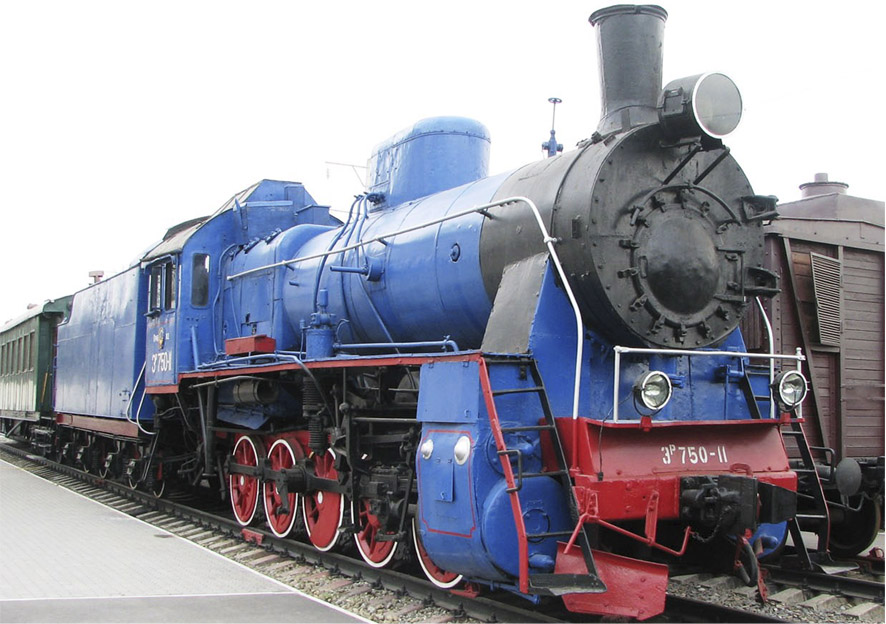
Class E^{r} steam locomotive

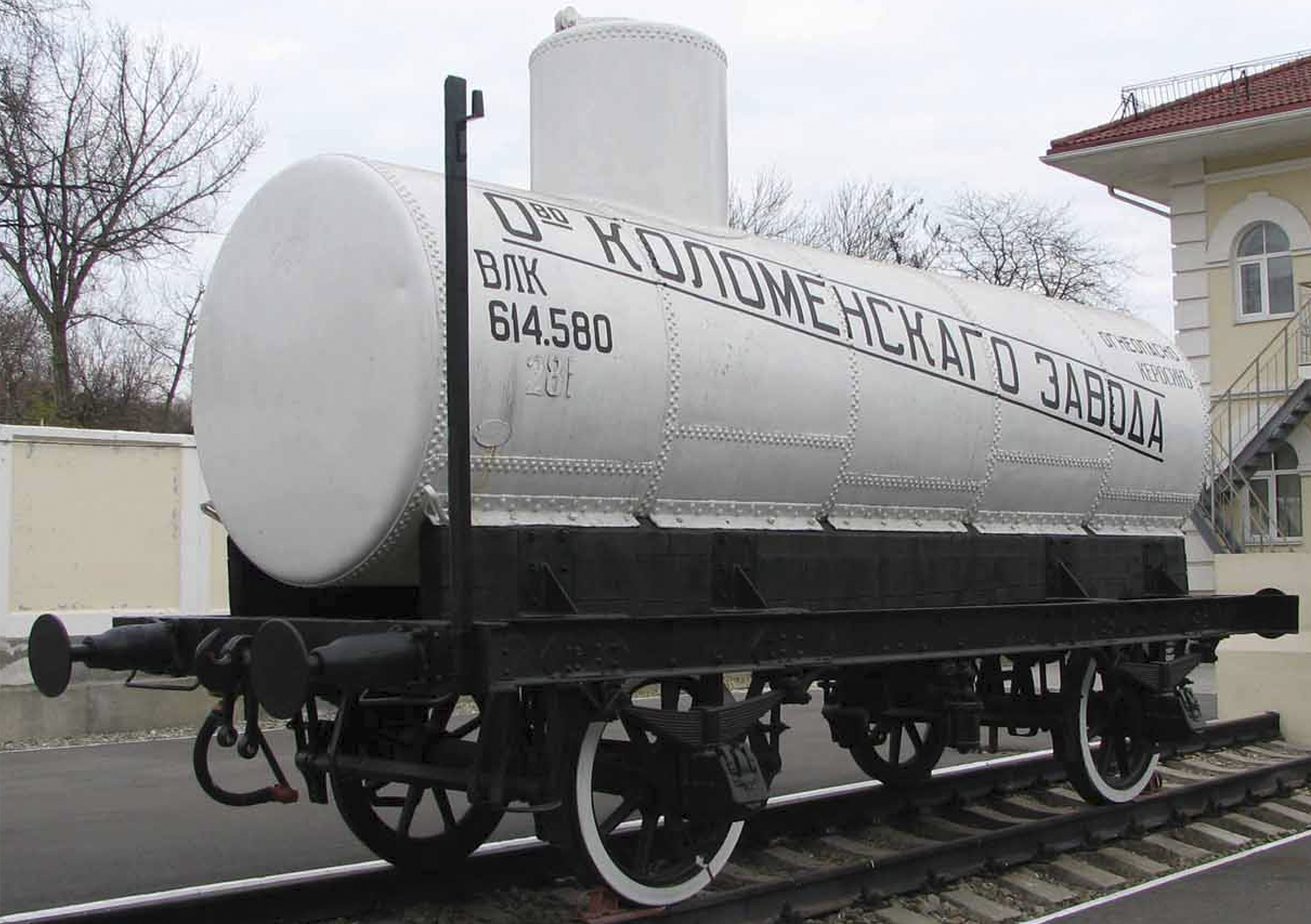
A tank car

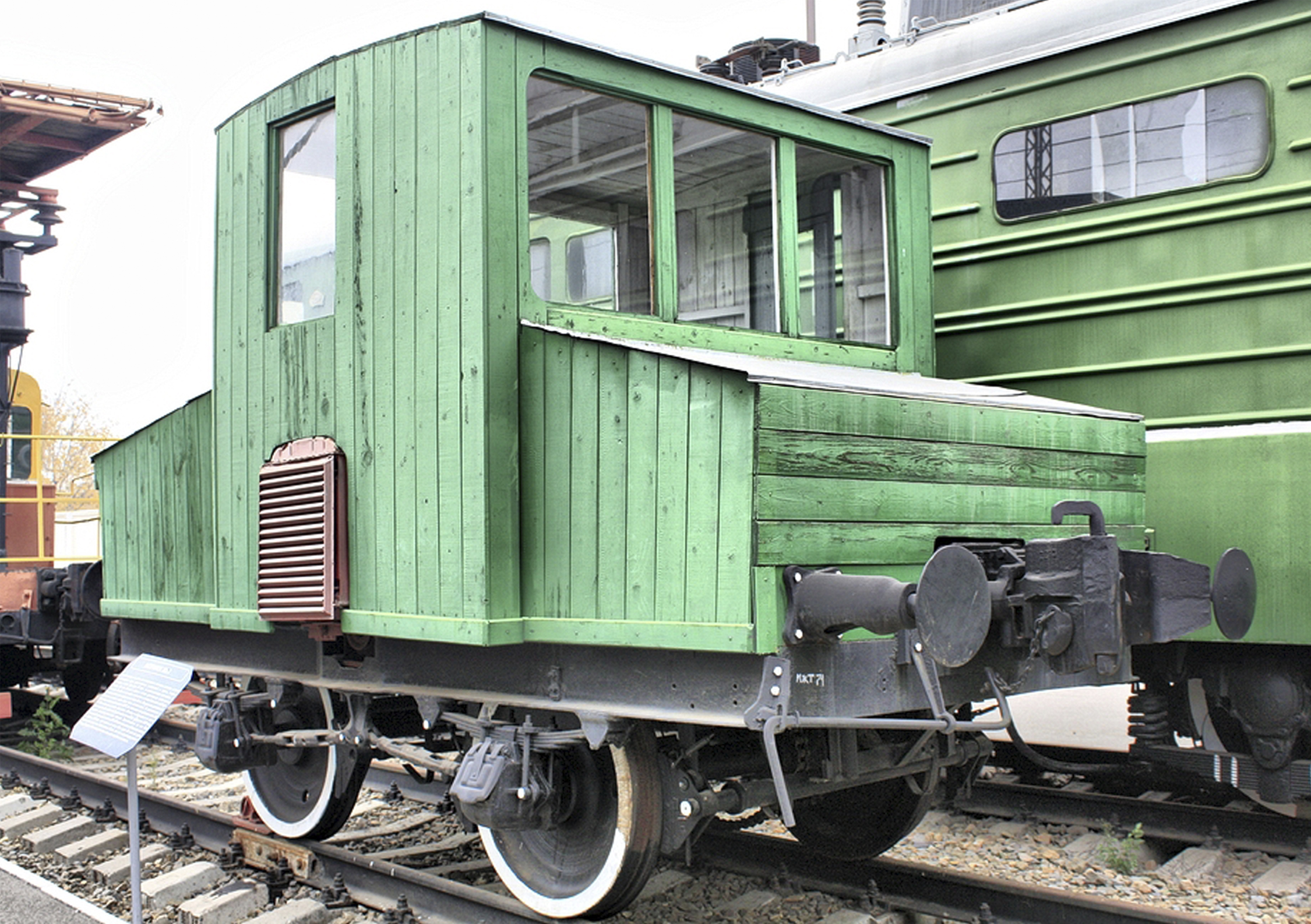
Class Mz2 motor locomotive

The exhibition presents freight and passenger carriages, motor locomotives, track motorcars, draisines, maintenance vehicles, semaphore, light-traffic, water crane. The oldest object is a tank car for chemicals from the late 19th century. The following full-size locomotives and electric multiple unit are on display.

=== Locomotives ===
- Class E steam locomotive
- Class FD steam locomotive
- Class L steam locomotive
- Class P36 steam locomotive
- Class TE steam locomotive (trophy german Class 52)
- Class SO steam locomotive
- Class S^{u} steam locomotive
- Class TE3 diesel locomotive
- Class TEP60 diesel locomotive
- Class TEP10 diesel locomotive
- Class TEM1 diesel locomotive
- Class TU10 narrow gauge diesel locomotive
- Class VL8 electric locomotive
- Class VL22^{m} electric locomotive
- Class VL41 electric locomotive
- Class VL61 electric locomotive
- Class VL80 electric locomotive
- Class VL84 electric locomotive
- Class ChS4 electric locomotive

=== Electric multiple unit ===
- ER22 series electric multiple unit (two driving cars and a power car)
