= Eastern Orthodoxy in Moldova =

Most Practiced faith in Moldova

The Eastern Orthodox Church in Moldova is represented by two jurisdictions -- the Metropolis of Chișinău and All Moldova, commonly referred to as the Moldovan Orthodox Church, a self-governing church body under the Russian Orthodox Church, and by the Metropolis of Bessarabia, also referred to as the Bessarabian Orthodox Church, a self-governing church body under the Romanian Orthodox Church. According to a 2011 Gallup survey on religion, among the Eastern Orthodox of Moldova, 86% belonged to the Moldovan Orthodox Church, while 13% belonged to the Bessarabian Orthodox Church. Other Orthodox jurisdictions - non canonical ones included - have few other parishes in the region.

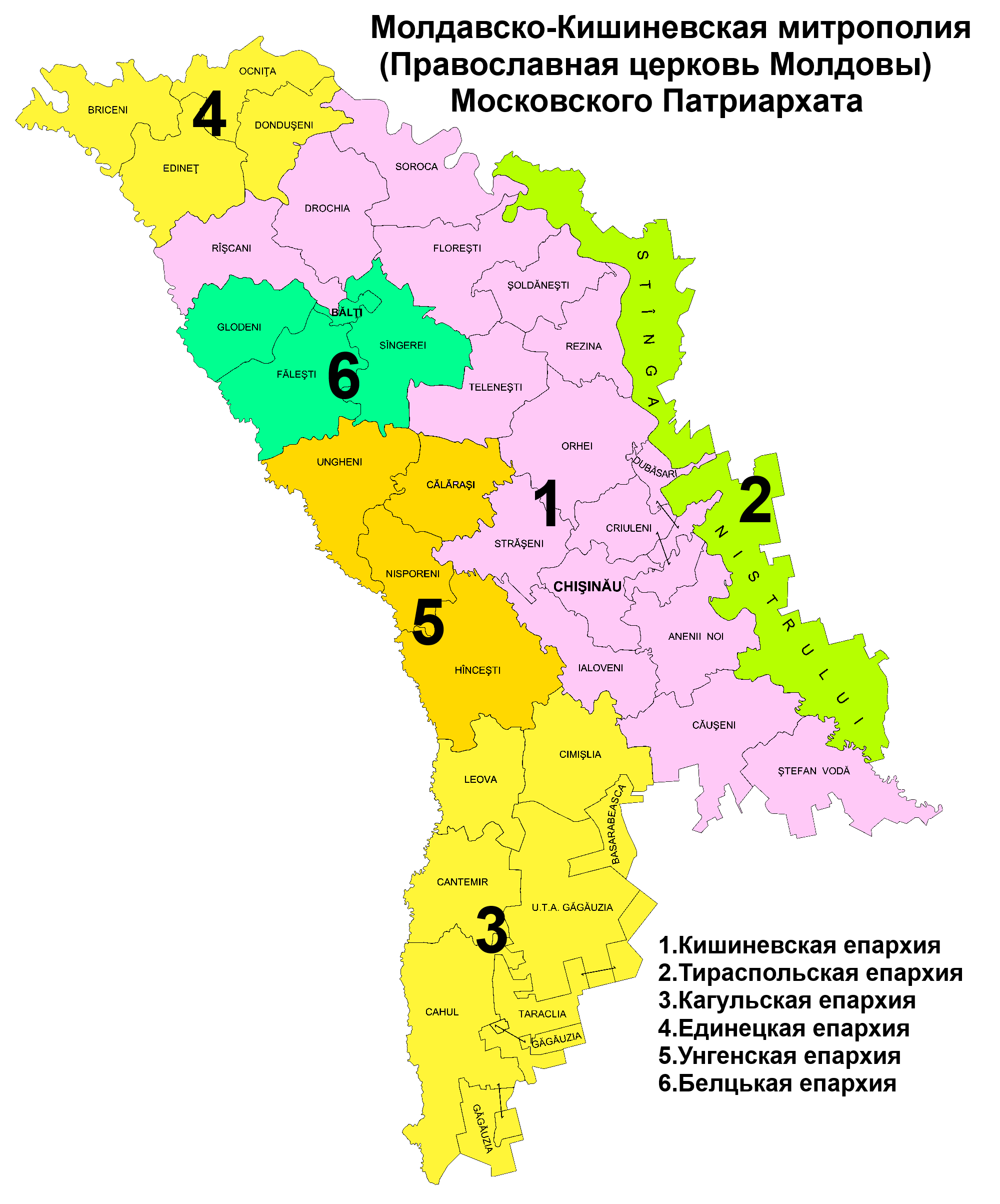
Eparchies of the Metropolis of Chișinău and All Moldova

Eparchies of the Metropolis of Bessarabia

== History ==
=== Middle Ages ===
The first attested Christian organization the territory of the later Principality of Moldavia was the Catholic Diocese of Cumania in the southern part of the region, dating from 1227, at a time when the Kingdom of Hungary attempted to extend its control in the region. However, as early as 1234, Orthodox Moldovans are mentioned in the diocese, having their own "pseudobishops" (or rural bishops). The diocese was soon destroyed by the Mongol invasion of 1241, and only beginning with the late 13th century did Catholic missionaries become active again in southern Moldavia.

In the early stages of its statehood (14th century), Moldavia was under the authority of the Orthodox bishop of Halych. Around 1371, during the reign of Lațcu, the court passed to Catholicism and a Catholic diocese was founded at Siret. The conversion was reverted soon after, with voivode Roman I of Moldavia installing a local cleric as bishop. By 1391 a new Orthodox metropolitan, Joseph of Belgorod, had been ordained by the archbishop of Halych. The move was opposed by the Patriarchate of Constantinople, who in 1391 named Theodosius as Metropolitan bishop of Moldavia. Around 1392, the same position was given by the Patriarch to Jeremiah. The Moldovan rulers refused to accept either and banished the latter from Moldavia, action resulting in an anathema against Moldavia issued by the Patriarch of Constantinople. A further two patriarchal missions were sent to Moldavia in 1395 and 1397 in a bid to regain authority over the local church. As the Mitropolitan see remained canonically vacant in 1394, the Moldavian priest Peter was named exarch over Moldavia by Constantinople, a move that probably was not accepted by the local rulers either.

In 1401 the voivode Alexandru cel Bun obtained from the Patriarchate of Constantinople the recognition of Joseph, whose anathema had been raised on the occasion, as head of an autonomous Metropolitan Moldavian See at Suceava, with 3 bishoprics and jurisdiction over the entire territory of the Principality of Moldavia. The Catholics were also favoured by Alexandru and in 1417 a new Roman Catholic bishop was ordained at Baia, with authority mainly over Hungarian and German merchants in that market town. Moldavia also sent delegates to the Catholic Council of Constance in 1421. All these caused problems for the Metropolitan bishop, who was called to Constantinople in 1415 but had to wait until 1471, when the new patriarch was enthroned, to have his position reconfirmed. Moldavia's extensive diplomatic relations with the Pope did not contribute to good relations between the Moldavian church ad its direct superior, the Patriarch of Constantinople. Towards 1436, the Pope named a Moldavian, Gregory, as Archbishop of Moldavia, however he was never recognized by the rulers of the country, and disappeared from history. Moldavian delegates were also present at the Council of Florence, where Damian, the Moldavian Orthodox metropolitan, signed the Union of the Western and Eastern Churches.

From the 15th century the Patriarchate of Constantinople was forced to content itself with subordination to the Ottoman Sultanate, the Metropolitan of Moldavia being ordained since by the Archbishop of Ohrid.

=== Modern times ===
The 17th century saw the adoption of the national language in the church (when many religious texts were translated in Romanian, especially during the time of Metropolitan Dosoftei), which replaced Old Slavonic language. In 1677, the seat of the Metropolis of Moldavia was permanently moved to Iași.

=== 19th century ===
Bessarabia, the eastern half of the Principality of Moldavia, was annexed by the Russian Empire in 1812, including the territory constituting the Chişinău Eparchy, which was reorganized and placed under the Russian Orthodox Church. Its first Metropolitan was Gavril Bănulescu-Bodoni, a popular promoter of the Romanian language and culture. Its last metropolitan was Anastasius Gribanovsky, the future first-hierarch of the Russian Orthodox Church Abroad.

=== 20th century ===
In January 1918 Bessarabia proclaimed independence as Moldavian Democratic Republic and in April 1918 it united with Romania. The territory of modern-day Republic of Moldova was then made a part of the Metropolitanate of Bessarabia, under the Romanian Orthodox Church.

After World War II, Bessarabia was occupied by the USSR, which was hostile to the church. The body of the church was downgraded to a "Bishopric of Chişinău and Moldova" under the Russian Orthodox Church.

After 1991, the Bishop of Bălți, Petru, led a movement that re-instated the former Metropolitan See of Bessarabia, reviving the one existing in the interwar period, and placing it under the authority of the Romanian Orthodox Church, but retaining a larger degree of autonomy than the other Metropolitanates of the Romanian Orthodox Church.

In October 1992, the Bishopric of Chișinău was elevated to Metropolitan Church of Chișinău and all Moldova and granted autonomy by the Russian Orthodox Church. Later the state re-registered the churches and refused to register the Metropolitanate of Bassarabia, which led to a lengthy court action that lasted until the European Court of Human Rights ordered the Moldovan state to register it, in 2004. An uneasy peace exists nowadays between the two Churches. The majority of the population remains under the Metropolitan Church of Chișinău and all Moldova, while ca. 20% are under the Metropolitan See of Bessarabia.

=== 21st century ===
Current status of the 2018 schism by Orthodox Church jurisdiction. Recognises OCU autocephaly Concelebrated with or commemorated OCU primate in Divine Liturgy diptych No definitive statements yet on OCU Does NOT recognise OCU autocephaly Territorial disputes between Moscow Patriarchate (MP) and Ecumenical Patriarchate of Constantinople or Romanian Orthodox Church. The latter represents the ongoing disputes between the Metropolis of Bessarabia and the Metropolis of Chișinău and All Moldova.

After the full-scale Russian invasion of Ukraine began on 24 February 2022, the clergy of the Moldovan Orthodox Church attempted to either stay neutral, such as Metropolitan Vladimir Cantarean, or covertly or openly collaborated with the Russian Orthodox Church's stance of publicly supporting Russia's war of aggression, either through statements or through financial support of bribing rural voters to elect pro-Russian opposition politicians in order to undermine the pro-Ukrainian and pro-EU Moldovan government of Maia Sandu. Meanwhile, public trust in the Moldovan Orthodox Church declined from 90 to 70% according to Metropolitan Vladimir (who explicitly linked it to his Church's institutional links with Moscow), or from 73 to 58% between 2021–2023 according to the Moldovan Institute for Public Policy. This caused conflict and dissent within the leadership of the Moscow-aligned Moldovan Orthodox Church, with a discussion in November 2023 on whether to stay under the aegis of the Moscow Patriarchate or to transfer to the Patriarchate of Bucharest reaching no consensus.

This led an increasing number of MOC priests to join the Metropolis of Bessarabia, under the jurisdiction of Bucharest. That trend of priests changing their loyalties from Moscow to Bucharest already existed, but Russia's invasion of Ukraine and the Kremlin and Moscow Patriarchate's concerted attempts to use their soft power in rural areas to undermine Moldovan society only intensified this phenomenon in the mid-2020s. On 18 August 2023, 6 dissident priests of the Metropolis of Moldova voluntarily joined the Metropolis of Bessarabia, which was not canonically prohibited at the time; but just five days later, they were suddenly stripped of all their clerical authority by the Moscow-linked church, and essentially excommunicated. The dissident priests interpreted this as an attempt at intimidating other doubting priests into not following their example to defect to the Patriarchate of Bucharest. The Bessarabian Metropolis has welcomed with open arms all clergy and believers willing to transition to its jurisdiction, with Bucharest also providing priests with monthly salaries of 250 euros and medical insurance and pensions, which the Moldovan Orthodox Church does not. In June 2023, Romania's Prime Minister Marcel Ciolacu announced that Romania will fund the Metropolis of Bessarabia with 2 million euros per year. In December 2023, Agence France-Presse and the Kyiv Post estimated the Moscow-linked Moldovan Metropolis to govern 1,350 parishes and the Bucharest-linked Bessarabian Metropolis about 200 parishes, but quoted an official from Bessarabia as saying over 50 parishes had switched allegiance from Moscow to Bucharest since the invasion of February 2022. In September 2024, the Orthodox Times reported that more than 60 priests and their parishes had transitioned from the Moldovan Orthodox Church to the Metropolis of Bessarabia since the beginning of Russia's full-scale war against Ukraine, bringing the total number of Bessarabian parishes above 200. In February 2026, Reuters reported the Metropolis of Bessarabia as having "about 300 parishes", versus "about 1,000 parishes" remaining in the hands of the Metropolis of Moldova.

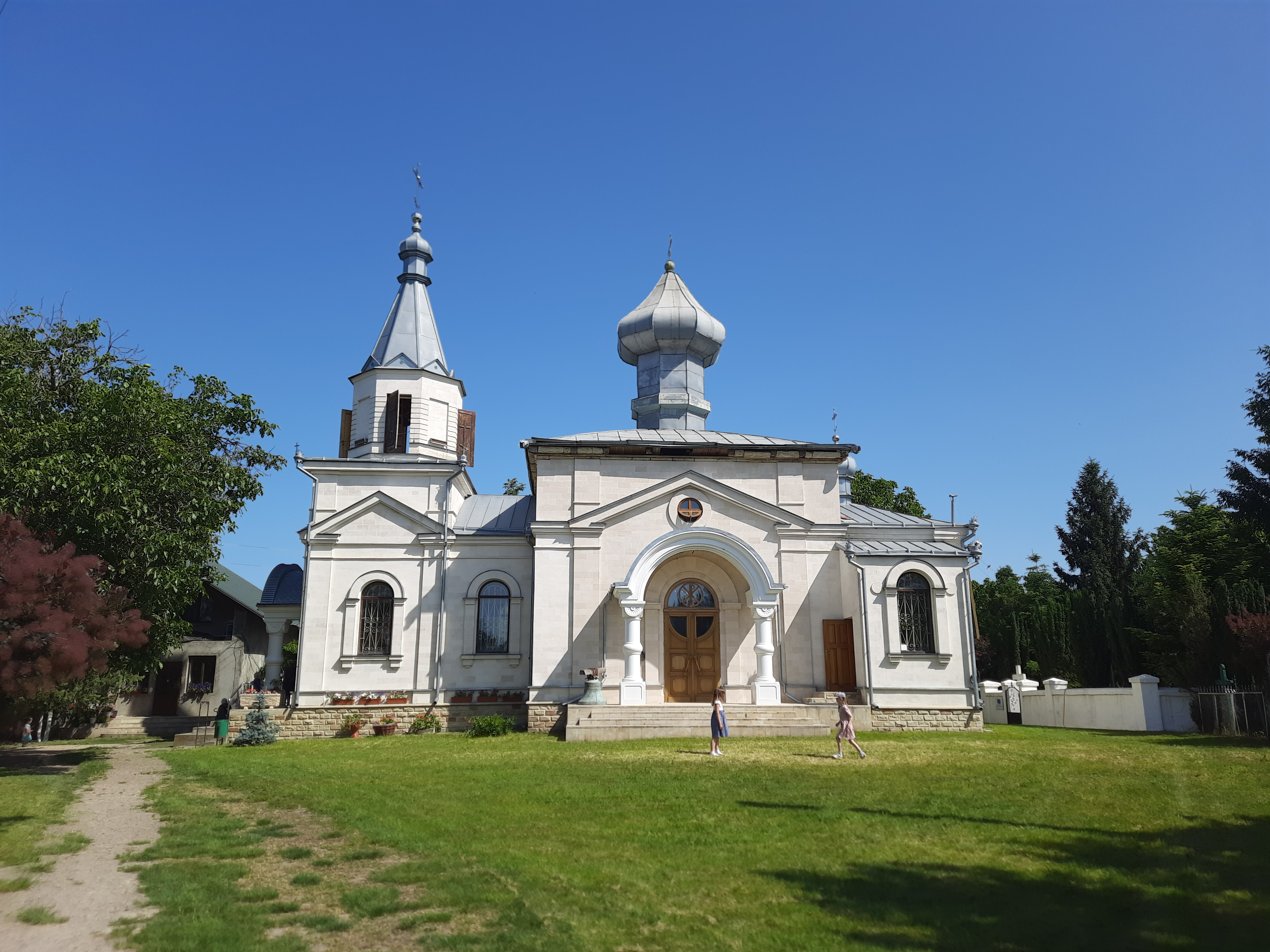
The parish of St Michael's Church, Dubăsarii Vechi decided to switch to the Bessarabian Metropolis, who won a court ruling on its usage in November 2025, as the 2003 contract signed between the then-government and the Moscow-linked Moldovan Orthodox Church was found to be illegal.

While there are over 800 state-protected monumental church buildings across the Republic of Moldova, on 4 January 2003, the Minister of Culture (of the Communist coalition) signed a contract with the Metropolis of Moldova, granting the Moldovan Orthodox Church the exclusive right to use all monumental church buildings. This happened again in September 2008, with the Ministry of Culture transferring 21 monumental monasteries exclusively to the Metropolis of Moldova for 50 years. It was not until 2010 that the Bessarabian Metropolis learned of the existence of these contracts during a trial at the Telenești Court; since July of that same year, it has sought to annul both these contracts as illegal. On 5 April 2023, after 13 years of procedures, the Metropolis of Bessarabia finally won a landmark legal challenge at the Chișinău Court of Appeals, which ruled that the 2003 and 2008 contracts were illegal, and thus null and void, as they violated the Government Decision of 2002 that stipulated a very strict procedure to distribute the usage of all state-protected monumental church buildings fairly amongst the religious communities concerned. Ever since the April 2023 ruling, the Metropolis of Bessarabia has been requesting the annulment of the Moldovan Metropolis' usage rights, parish by parish. In November 2025, the Bessarabian Metropolis won another court case concerning St Michael's Church, Dubăsarii Vechi, whose religious community had decided to switch from the Moldovan to the Bessarabian Metropolis, which the Moldovan Orthodox Church had refused based on its 2003 contract with the government.

In many cases, the parishioners and priest have come to a consensus to transition their religious community, with sometimes parishioners telling their priests "that they no longer wanted to come to Kirill's church to receive communion", such as in Cimișeni in late 2023, and in Glodeni and Răuțel in March 2024. However, some cases have been reported of priests and parishioners reaching opposite conclusions about their loyalties, such as a priest in Grinăuți, Rîșcani seeking to transition to the Metropolis of Bessarabia, whereas a community vote of parishioners showed a large majority favouring its ties with the Metropolis of Chișinău and All Moldova in July 2025. In late January 2026, the Supreme Court of Justice of Moldova confirmed an earlier ruling that the Church of the Dormition of the Mother of God in Dereneu was to be transferred to the jurisdiction of the Metropolis of Bessarabia. Therefore, in February 2026, a Bessarabian priest took over the church building in line with the ruling, but was then forcibly removed by opposing parishioners who broke through a police cordon, and then occupied the church and barricaded themselves inside. In both cases, the Moldovan authorities have tended to side with the priest as having the highest authority within a given religious community, and thus being the ultimate decision-maker of a parish's legal status, pointing to the court's decision, although they are trying to be cautious not to engage in what may be regarded as state interference in internal religious disputes. Prime Minister Alexandru Munteanu said about the Dereneu case that the law had to be upheld, while President of the Moldovan Parliament Igor Grosu said the ruling of the Supreme Court of Justice had to be respected, and that the church "must not be used as a political tool or a factor of social division". Conversely, the pro-Russian opposition leader Igor Dodon argued that the state should stay out of church politics.

== See also ==
- History of Christianity in Romania
- Religion in Moldova
- Catholic Church in Moldova
