= Baháʼí Faith in Moldova =

The Baháʼí Faith in Moldova began during the policy of oppression of religion in the former Soviet Union. Before that time, Moldova, as part of the Russian Empire, would have had indirect contact with the Baháʼí Faith as far back as 1847. In 1974 the first Baháʼí arrived in Moldova. and following the dissolution of the Soviet Union in late 1991, communities of Baháʼís, and respective National Spiritual Assemblies, developed across the nations of the former Soviet Union. In 1996 Moldova elected its own National Spiritual Assembly. Baháʼí sources said there were about 400 adherents in Moldova in 2004. The Association of Religion Data Archives estimated some 527 Baháʼís in 2005.

== History in the region ==
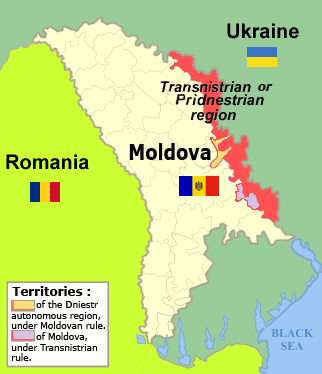
regions of Moldova

Most of today's Republic of Moldova, formerly known as Bessarabia until 1812, was annexed by the Russian Empire. Moldavia was a Mediaeval principality in Europe which was part of the basis of the modern Romanian state; at various times, the state included the regions of Bessarabia. The western part of Moldavia is now part of Romania, the eastern part belongs to the independent state of Moldova, while the northern and south-eastern parts are territories of Ukraine. See History of Moldova and History of Moldavia. Additionally Transnistria is a breakaway republic within the internationally recognised borders of Moldova. Although not recognized by any state or international organisation and de jure part of Moldova, it is de facto independent.

=== As part of the Russian Empire ===
The earliest relationship between the Baháʼí Faith and Moldova comes under the sphere of the country's history with Russia. During that time the history stretches back to 1847 when the Russian ambassador to Persia, Prince Dimitri Ivanovich Dolgorukov, requested that the Báb, the herald to the Baháʼí Faith who was imprisoned at Maku, be moved elsewhere; he also condemned the massacres of Iranian religionists, and asked for the release of Baháʼu'lláh, the founder of the Baháʼí Faith. In 1884 Leo Tolstoy first heard of the Baháʼí Faith and was sympathetic to some of its teachings. Also, orientalist A. Tumanskim translated some Baháʼí literature into Russian in 1899 in Saint Petersburg. In the 1880s an organized community of Baháʼís was in Ashgabat and later built the first Baháʼí House of Worship in 1913–1918. In 1904 a play by poet Isabella Grinevskaya called "Báb" was presented in Saint Petersburg and lauded by Tolstoy and other reviewers at the time.

=== Soviet period ===
In 1974, Annemarie Kruger, granddaughter of Swiss Baháʼí August Forel, arrived as the first Baháʼí in Moldova and was named a Knight of Baháʼu'lláh.

=== Developing community ===
In 1990 several Local Spiritual Assemblies formed across the Soviet Union in 1990. Following the dissolution of the Soviet Union in late 1991, communities of Baháʼís, and respective National Spiritual Assemblies, developed across the nations of the former Soviet Union. At first Ukraine, Belarus and Moldova shared a regional Spiritual Assembly in 1992. In 1994, the 20th anniversary of the religion in Moldova and the year of its registration with the national government, the Baha'i community was listed in a UN report as having 6 Local Spiritual Assemblies. In 1996 Moldova elected their own National Spiritual Assembly.

== Modern community ==
In 2002 there were several Baháʼí pilgrims from many former Soviet republics - Tatarstan, Russia, Belarus, Uzbekistan and Moldova - who were able to see now deceased Hand of the Cause ʻAlí-Akbar Furútan, himself a former resident of Russia. As of 2004, at the 30th anniversary of the Baháʼí community of Moldova, Baháʼís claimed there were approximately 400 Baháʼís in Moldova - 150 of them are in Chişinău. The Association of Religion Data Archives (relying mostly on the World Christian Encyclopedia) estimated some 527 Baháʼís in 2005.

=== Diverse developments ===
Since its inception the religion has had involvement in socio-economic development beginning by giving greater freedom to women, promulgating the promotion of female education as a priority concern, and that involvement was given practical expression by creating schools, agricultural coops, and clinics. The religion entered a new phase of activity when a message of the Universal House of Justice dated 20 October 1983 was released. Baháʼís were urged to seek out ways, compatible with the Baháʼí teachings, in which they could become involved in the social and economic development of the communities in which they lived. Worldwide in 1979 there were 129 officially recognized Baháʼí socio-economic development projects. By 1987, the number of officially recognized development projects had increased to 1482. Withheld under the Soviet Bloc developments in Moldova have only been more recent. In 2003 Moldova held its first World Religion Day observance which was organized by the Baháʼís of Chişinău. Payâm-e-Dust Radio ("Radio Message from a Friend") began shortwave radio broadcasts from Moldova in 2001 and has since begun transmissions from other locations and gained internet-broadcast capacity.

In May 2007, the Moldovan government passed a law that defined the recognition process of religion. One hundred adherents were required to have a religion be recognized but that once established recognition is automatic. In 2008 the US government had noted significant progress in Moldova along the lines of consolidating democratic institutions and instituting the rule of law - especially the 1951 Convention Relating to the Status of Refugees and its 1967 Protocol and becoming a NATO partner country. The government of Moldova supported United Nations Resolution A/RES/62/168 which was adopted by the General Assembly on 18 December 2007, on concerns raised by human rights situations and reports of special rapporteurs and representatives on the situation of human rights in the Islamic Republic of Iran. In February 2008 the Moldovan government rose in support of a declaration by the President of Slovenia on behalf of the European Union on the deteriorating situation of the Baháʼís in Iran. Moldova's support of UN declarations about the Baháʼís in Iran was reprised in February 2009 following the announcement of a trial of the leadership of the Baháʼís of Iran when the Presidency of the European Union "denounced" the trial. See Persecution of Baháʼís.

== See also ==
- Religion in Moldova
- Freedom of religion in Moldova
- Transnistria
- Baháʼí Faith in Ukraine
