= Diocese of Bălți and Fălești =

Moldovan Orthodox diocese

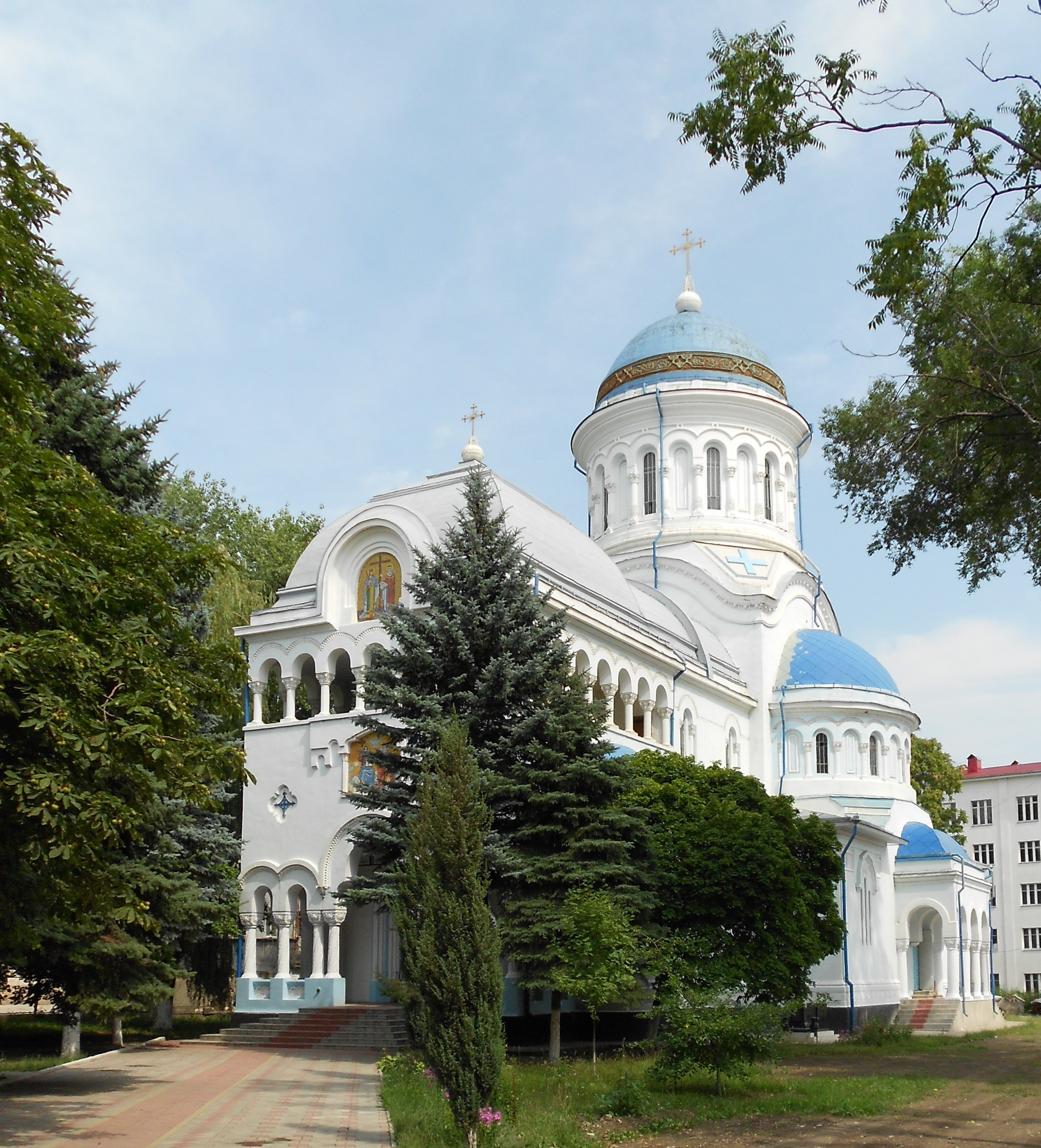
Catedrala. Sf. Const si Elen. din Bălți

The Diocese of Bălți and Fălești (Romanian: Eparhia de Bălți și Fălești, Russian: Бельцкая и Фалештская епархия) is an eparchy or diocese of the Metropolis of Chișinău and All Moldova under the Moscow Patriarchate with its seat at the Cathedral of Sts. Constantine and Helena in Bălți, Moldova.

== History ==
The Diocese of Bălți and Fălești was established on October 6, 2006, by the Holy Synod of the Russian Orthodox Church out of the territory of the Diocese of Chișinău. The Holy Synod elected Archimandrite Marchel (Mihăescu) as the first Bishop of Bălți and Fălești.

As of 2010 the Eparchy consisted of 104 parishes, 2 monasteries, and 3 sketes served by 129 full-time priests and 10 deacons.
