= Metropolis of Bessarabia =

Metropolis of the Romanian Orthodox Church

- Organization of the Metropolis of Bessarabia

Location
- Territory: Moldova
- Metropolitan: Antonie
- Headquarters: Chișinău

Statistics
- Population: Total: 720,000

Information
- Denomination: Eastern Orthodox
- Sui iuris church: Romanian Patriarchate (Autonomous Metropolis)
- Established: 1918
- Language: Romanian

Website
- mitropoliabasarabiei.md

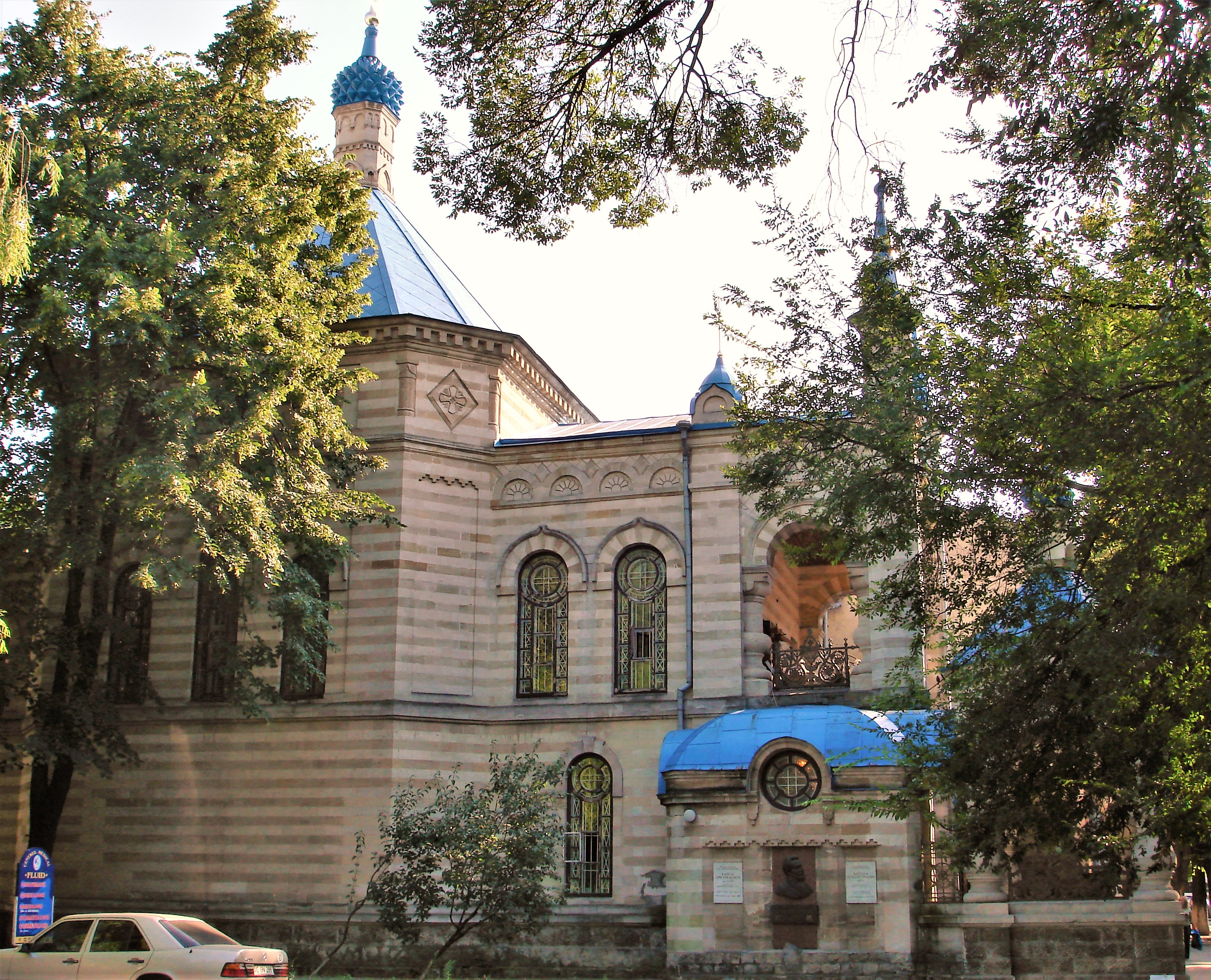
St. Teodora de la Sihla Church

Administrative map of the Romanian Orthodox Church, including the Metropolis of Bessarabia

The Metropolis of Bessarabia (Romanian: Mitropolia Basarabiei), also referred to as the Bessarabian Orthodox Church, is an autonomous Eastern Orthodox Metropolitan bishopric of the Romanian Orthodox Church, situated in Moldova. Its canonical jurisdiction is the territory of the Republic of Moldova, and over the Moldovan and Romanian Orthodox diaspora from the former USSR.

The Metropolis of Bessarabia was created in 1918, as the Archbishopric of Chișinău, and organized as a Metropolis, in 1927. Inactive during the Soviet occupation of Bessarabia (1940–1941) and the Soviet rule in Moldova (1944–1991), the Metropolis of Bessarabia was re-activated on 14 September 1992, and raised to the rank of exarchate, in 1995.

== History ==
=== 19th century ===
In 1812, after the annexation of Bessarabia by the Russian Empire, the Orthodox churches were re-organized as the Eparchy of Chișinău and Hotin, from the churches and monasteries of the Metropolis of Moldavia on that territory that no longer belonged to the Principality of Moldavia, by Gavril Bănulescu-Bodoni, a popular promoter of Moldavian/Romanian language and culture, who also served as its first archbishop. After 1821, the Russian state and church started an extended policy of Russification.

In 1858, after southern Bessarabia was returned to Moldavia, which soon united with Wallachia to form Romania, the Orthodox churches in Cahul, Bolgrad, and Ismail re-entered under the Romanian Church jurisdiction of the Metropolis of Moldavia, which established the Diocese of the Lower Danube, in 1864. In 1878, after Russia re-annexed southern Bessarabia, the Russian Church jurisdiction was reinstated.

=== 20th century ===
In 1918, after the Union of Bessarabia with Romania, the archbishop Anastasius Gribanovsky of the Eparchy of Chişinău was ousted after he refused to accede to Romania's demand to secede from the Russian Orthodox Church and integrate the eparchy in the Romanian one. With the advent of Greater Romania in 1918, there were three church bodies: the autocephalous Romanian Orthodox Church (on the territory of Smaller Romania—prior to 1918—formed in 1872 from the union of the Metropolis of Ungrovlahia with Metropolis of Moldavia), and the non-autocephalous Metropolis of Bessarabia and Metropolis of Transylvania. Therefore, in 1925, the rank of the Romanian Orthodox Church was raised to that of a Patriarchate, with the Metropolis of Bessarabia as one of its five sees. Gurie Grosu was the first Metropolitan of Bessarabia, and Efrem Enăchescu the second.

After the Soviet occupation of Bessarabia in 1940, the church, which then was a non-autonomous Metropolis, was banned, and its property has either changed uses, or was transferred to the Russian Orthodox Church, which established the Bishopric in Chişinău and Moldova. In 1980s, two more bishoprics were added, and the See raised to the status of the Archdiocese, in 1990, and as the Metropolis of Chișinău and All Moldova, in 1992.

After Moldova's independence in 1991, part of the clergy followed Petru Păduraru, the Bishop of Bălţi, and re-established the Metropolis of Bessarabia. The Romanian Orthodox Church considered that, during the time, the Russian Orthodox Church jurisdiction on the former territory of Bessarabia was an unfair and abusive act in terms of historical reality and canon law, and as long as it remains under the Russian Orthodox Church, the jurisdiction right of the Metropolis of Chișinău and All Moldova can be exercised only to the Russian ethnics of Moldova.

The Russian Orthodox Church also refused to recognize the authority of the Bessarabian church, and the two metropolia started an uneasy co-existence. During the 1990s, the one subordinated to the Russian Orthodox Church gained the protection of the country's authorities and established itself as the official church, while the Orthodox Church of Bessarabia was refused registration according to the country's new law of religions.

=== 21st century ===
In 2004, after years of legal hurdles and a final decision by the European Court of Human Rights, the Orthodox Church of Bessarabia received official registration, the Supreme Court of Justice of the Republic of Moldova recognizing it as "the spiritual, canonical, historical successor of the Metropolitan See of Bessarabia which functioned till 1944, including". About 20% of country's Orthodox churches were or changed to be under its jurisdictions; a strong desire to similar moves has been expressed in many other parishes.

This decision continues to be a major area of tension with the Russian Orthodox Church. The position of the Romanian Orthodox Church in the dispute with the Russian Orthodox Church over the territorial jurisdiction is, according to a press release, that the two Metropolitan Sees should "peacefully co-exist and brotherly cooperate (…) harmonising, with wisdom and realism, the territorial principle with the ethnic principle, as agreed in the pastoral service of the Orthodox in Diaspora."

==== Rapid growth during the Russian invasion of Ukraine ====
Current status of the 2018 schism by Orthodox Church jurisdiction. Recognises OCU autocephaly Concelebrated with or commemorated OCU primate in Divine Liturgy diptych No definitive statements yet on OCU Does NOT recognise OCU autocephaly Territorial disputes between Moscow Patriarchate (MP) and Ecumenical Patriarchate of Constantinople or Romanian Orthodox Church. The latter represents the ongoing disputes between the Metropolis of Bessarabia and the Metropolis of Chișinău and All Moldova.

After the full-scale Russian invasion of Ukraine began on 24 February 2022, the clergy of the Moldovan Orthodox Church attempted to either stay neutral, such as Metropolitan Vladimir Cantarean, or covertly or openly collaborated with the Russian Orthodox Church's stance of publicly supporting Russia's war of aggression, either through statements or through financial support of bribing rural voters to elect pro-Russian opposition politicians in order to undermine the pro-Ukrainian and pro-EU Moldovan government of Maia Sandu. Meanwhile, public trust in the Moldovan Orthodox Church declined from 90 to 70% according to Metropolitan Vladimir (who explicitly linked it to his Church's institutional links with Moscow), or from 73 to 58% between 2021–2023 according to the Moldovan Institute for Public Policy. This caused conflict and dissent within the leadership of the Moscow-aligned Moldovan Orthodox Church, with a discussion in November 2023 on whether to stay under the aegis of the Moscow Patriarchate or to transfer to the Patriarchate of Bucharest reaching no consensus.

This led an increasing number of MOC priests to join the Metropolis of Bessarabia, under the jurisdiction of Bucharest. That trend of priests changing their loyalties from Moscow to Bucharest already existed, but Russia's invasion of Ukraine and the Kremlin and Moscow Patriarchate's concerted attempts to use their soft power in rural areas to undermine Moldovan society only intensified this phenomenon in the mid-2020s. On 18 August 2023, 6 dissident priests of the Metropolis of Moldova voluntarily joined the Metropolis of Bessarabia, which was not canonically prohibited at the time; but just five days later, they were suddenly stripped of all their clerical authority by the Moscow-linked church, and essentially excommunicated. The dissident priests interpreted this as an attempt at intimidating other doubting priests into not following their example to defect to the Patriarchate of Bucharest. The Bessarabian Metropolis has welcomed with open arms all clergy and believers willing to transition to its jurisdiction, with Bucharest also providing priests with monthly salaries of 250 euros and medical insurance and pensions, which the Moldovan Orthodox Church does not. In June 2023, Romania's Prime Minister Marcel Ciolacu announced that Romania will fund the Metropolis of Bessarabia with 2 million euros per year. In December 2023, Agence France-Presse and the Kyiv Post estimated the Moscow-linked Moldovan Metropolis to govern 1,350 parishes and the Bucharest-linked Bessarabian Metropolis about 200 parishes, but quoted an official from Bessarabia as saying over 50 parishes had switched allegiance from Moscow to Bucharest since the invasion of February 2022. In September 2024, the Orthodox Times reported that more than 60 priests and their parishes had transitioned from the Moldovan Orthodox Church to the Metropolis of Bessarabia since the beginning of Russia's full-scale war against Ukraine, bringing the total number of Bessarabian parishes above 200. In February 2026, Reuters reported the Metropolis of Bessarabia as having "about 300 parishes", versus "about 1,000 parishes" remaining in the hands of the Metropolis of Moldova.

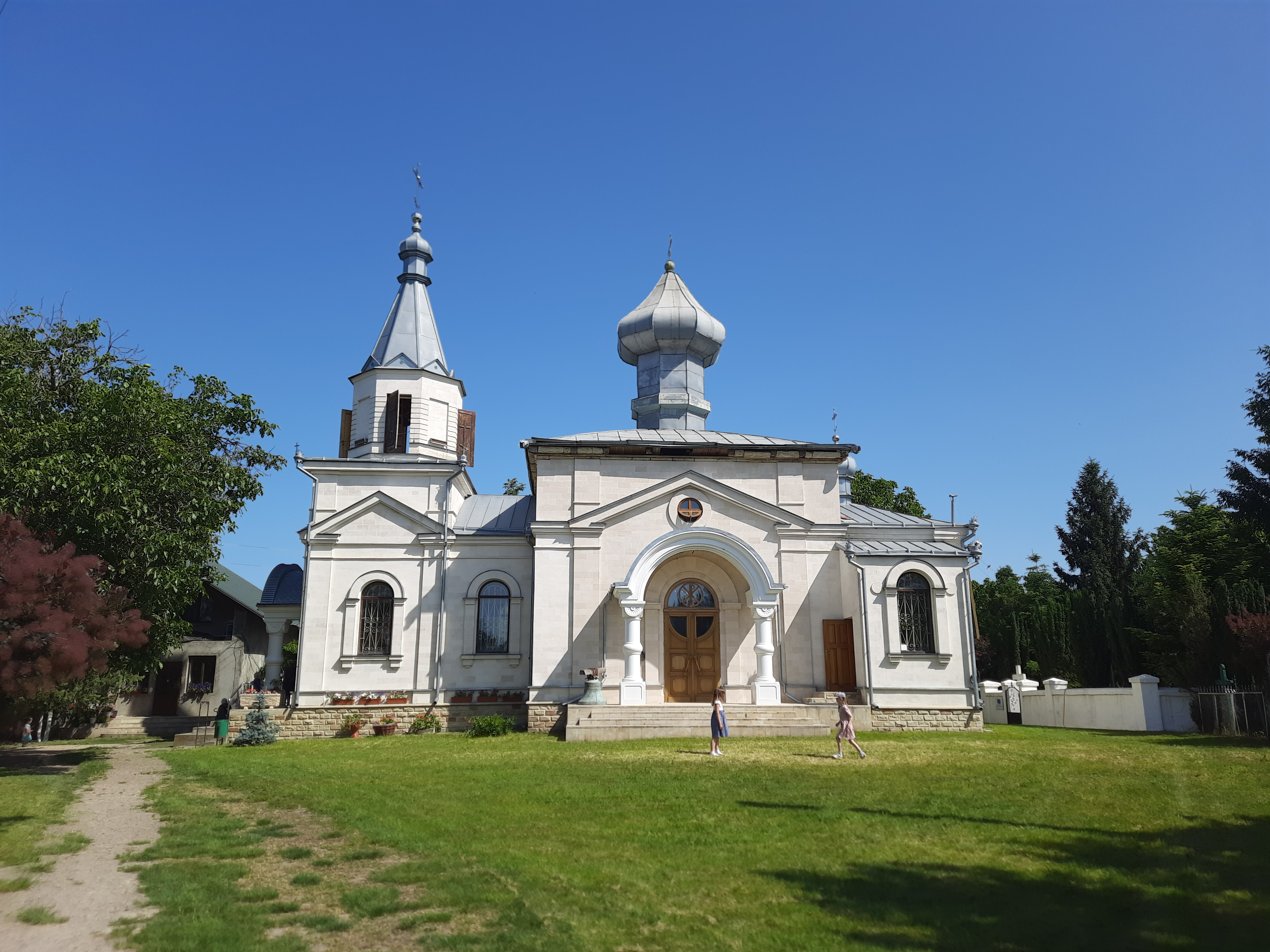
The parish of St Michael's Church, Dubăsarii Vechi decided to switch to the Bessarabian Metropolis, who won a court ruling on its usage in November 2025, as the 2003 contract signed between the then-government and the Moscow-linked Moldovan Orthodox Church was found to be illegal.

While there are over 800 state-protected monumental church buildings across the Republic of Moldova, on 4 January 2003, the Minister of Culture (of the Communist coalition) signed a contract with the Metropolis of Moldova, granting the Moldovan Orthodox Church the exclusive right to use all monumental church buildings. This happened again in September 2008, with the Ministry of Culture transferring 21 monumental monasteries exclusively to the Metropolis of Moldova for 50 years. It was not until 2010 that the Bessarabian Metropolis learned of the existence of these contracts during a trial at the Telenești Court; since July of that same year, it has sought to annul both these contracts as illegal. On 5 April 2023, after 13 years of procedures, the Metropolis of Bessarabia finally won a landmark legal challenge at the Chișinău Court of Appeals, which ruled that the 2003 and 2008 contracts were illegal, and thus null and void, as they violated the Government Decision of 2002 that stipulated a very strict procedure to distribute the usage of all state-protected monumental church buildings fairly amongst the religious communities concerned. Ever since the April 2023 ruling, the Metropolis of Bessarabia has been requesting the annulment of the Moldovan Metropolis' usage rights, parish by parish. In November 2025, the Bessarabian Metropolis won another court case concerning St Michael's Church, Dubăsarii Vechi, whose religious community had decided to switch from the Moldovan to the Bessarabian Metropolis, which the Moldovan Orthodox Church had refused based on its 2003 contract with the government.

In many cases, the parishioners and priest have come to a consensus to transition their religious community, with sometimes parishioners telling their priests "that they no longer wanted to come to Kirill's church to receive communion", such as in Cimișeni in late 2023, and in Glodeni and Răuțel in March 2024. However, some cases have been reported of priests and parishioners reaching opposite conclusions about their loyalties, such as a priest in Grinăuți, Rîșcani seeking to transition to the Metropolis of Bessarabia, whereas a community vote of parishioners showed a large majority favouring its ties with the Metropolis of Chișinău and All Moldova in July 2025. In late January 2026, the Supreme Court of Justice of Moldova confirmed an earlier ruling that the Church of the Dormition of the Mother of God in Dereneu was to be transferred to the jurisdiction of the Metropolis of Bessarabia. Therefore, in February 2026, a Bessarabian priest took over the church building in line with the ruling, but was then forcibly removed by opposing parishioners who broke through a police cordon, and then occupied the church and barricaded themselves inside. In both cases, the Moldovan authorities have tended to side with the priest as having the highest authority within a given religious community, and thus being the ultimate decision-maker of a parish's legal status, pointing to the court's decision, although they are trying to be cautious not to engage in what may be regarded as state interference in internal religious disputes. Prime Minister Alexandru Munteanu said about the Dereneu case that the law had to be upheld, while President of the Moldovan Parliament Igor Grosu said the ruling of the Supreme Court of Justice had to be respected, and that the church "must not be used as a political tool or a factor of social division". Conversely, the pro-Russian opposition leader Igor Dodon argued that the state should stay out of church politics.

== Structure and organization ==
The church is currently recognized only by some other Orthodox Churches, since the Patriarchate of Moscow opposes its recognition by all of them. The current Metropolitan of Bessarabia is Petru Păduraru (born 24 October 1946 in Ţiganca, elected as metropolitan in 1992), and it has about one third of the orthodox community in Moldova.

The Metropolis of Bessarabia consists of four eparchies:

- Archdiocese of Chișinău
- Diocese of Bălți
- Diocese of Southern Bessarabia
- Diocese of Dubăsari and Transnistria

== See also ==
- Eastern Orthodoxy in Moldova
- Religion in Moldova
- List of members of the Holy Synod of the Romanian Orthodox Church
- Metropolis of Moldavia and Bukovina
- St. Teodora de la Sihla Church
- Luminătorul
- Misionarul
- Metropolis of Chișinău and All Moldova - The autonomous metropolitanate in Moldova under the Russian Orthodox Church.

== Gallery ==
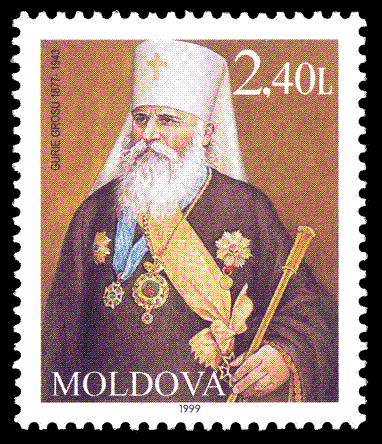
Gurie Grosu
