= Religion in Moldova =

Religion in Moldova (2024 census)
1. Eastern Orthodoxy (94.3%)
2. Other Christians (3.10%)
3. Atheism / Irreligion (1.50%)
4. Other religions (0.30%)
5. Unanswered (0.80%)

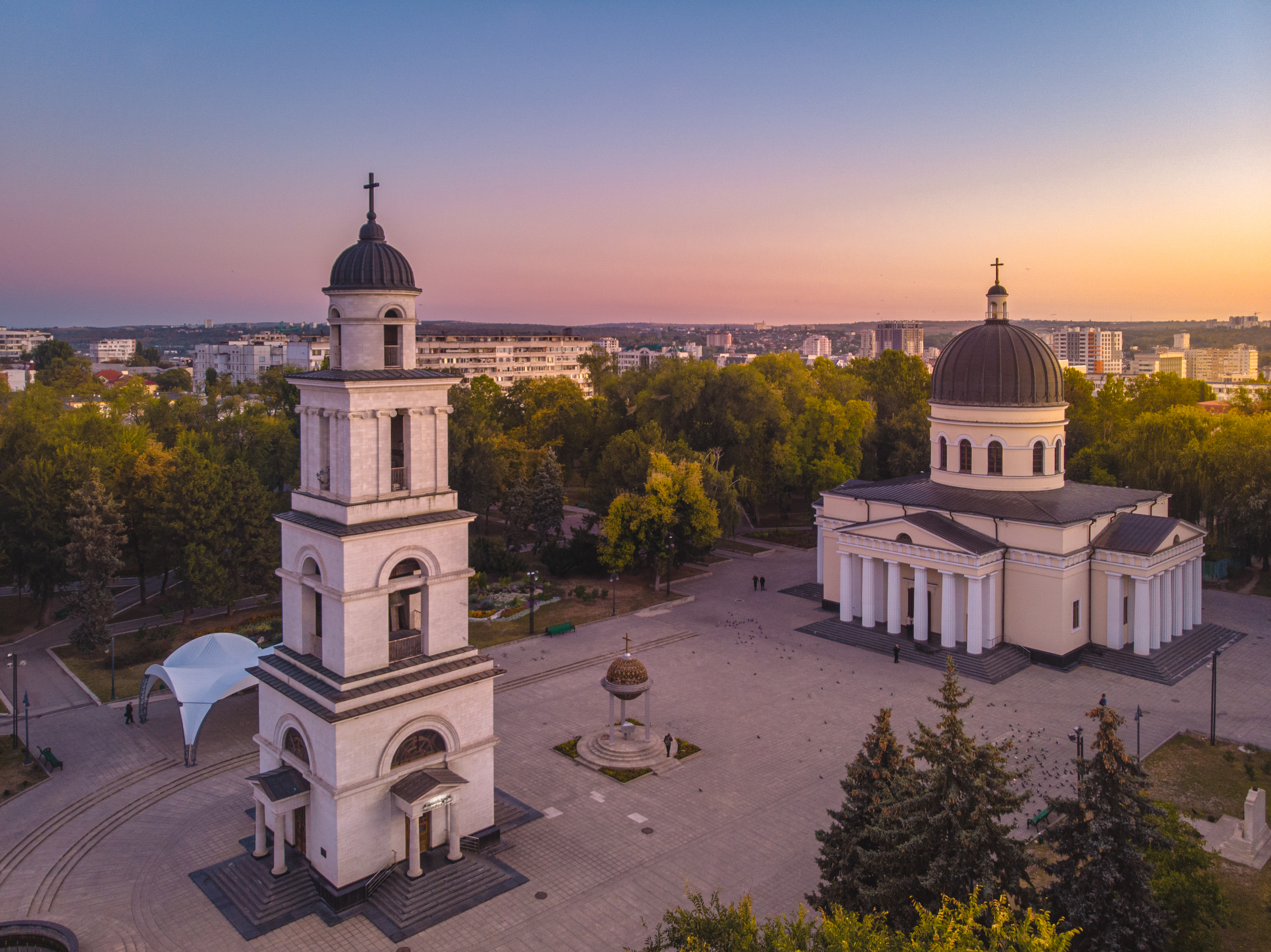
Cathedral of Christ's Nativity in Chișinău.

Moldova's constitution provides for freedom of religion and complete separation of church and state, though the constitution cites the "exceptional importance" of Eastern Orthodox Christianity. Discrimination on the basis of religious affiliation is illegal, and incitement to religious and ethnic hatred was made illegal in May 2022. Moldovans are overwhelmingly adherents of Eastern Orthodoxy. According to the 2024 Moldovan census, 95.2 per cent of the country reported to be of the Eastern Orthodox Christian faith. Of this number, around eighty to 90 per cent of Orthodox Moldovans belong to the Moldovan Orthodox Church (formally known as Metropolis of Chișinău and All Moldova) which is subordinate to the Russian Orthodox Church, and has played a powerful role in deepening Russia's influence in Moldova. The remaining 10–20 per cent of Orthodox Moldovans belong to the Metropolis of Bessarabia, which is subordinate to the Romanian Orthodox Church.

As of 2025, the Association of Religion Data Archives estimates that of the Moldovan population (3.7 million outside of Transnistria, which has a population of 533,000), the remaining non-Orthodox religious demography includes: 5.76% (211,000) non-Orthodox Christian (including Catholics and Protestants), 2.45% (90,000) irreligious (including agnostics and atheists); 0.46% (17,000) Muslim, and 0.09% (3,000) religious Jews. In 2011, the Moldovan Ministry of Justice recognised the Islamic League of Moldova as an NGO representing Moldovan Muslims. There are six synagogues in Chișinău, one in Orhei, one in Soroca, and one in Tiraspol, and one mosque in Chișinău. The Jewish Community of the Republic of Moldova is an organisation providing religious services for Moldovan Jews. The Transnistrian authorities estimate that 80% of the Transnistrian population belong to the Moldovan Orthodox Church; the remainder includes other Christians and Jews.

The 1992 Law on Religions, which codifies religious freedoms, contains restrictions that inhibit the activities of unregistered religious groups. Although the law was amended in 2002, many of the restrictions remain in place. The law provides for freedom of religious practice, including each person's right to profess his or her religion in any form. It also protects the confidentiality of the confessional, allows denominations to establish associations and foundations, and states that the Government may not interfere in the religious activities of denominations. The law specifies that "to organize and function", religious organizations must be registered with the Government, and unregistered groups may not own property, engage employees, or obtain space in public cemeteries in their own names.

== Christianity ==
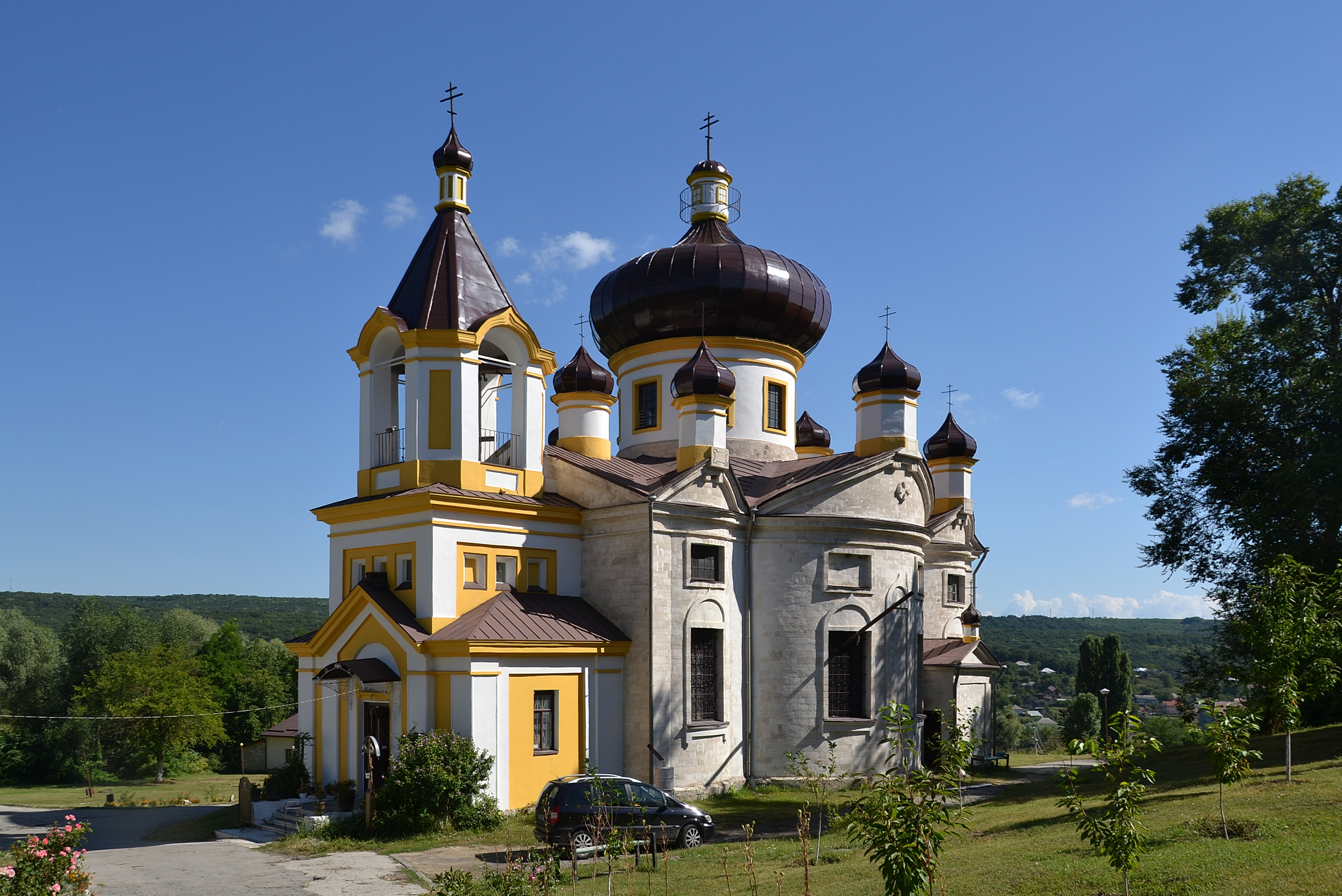
Moldavian Orthodox church in Condrița

=== Eastern Orthodox Church ===
The primary religion is Christianity, 95.2 per cent of the population nominally being Eastern Orthodox according to data of the 2024 census. Administratively, there are two autonomous churches belonging to two autocephalous churches (Russian and Romanian) within the Eastern Orthodox communion. The autonomous Metropolis of Chişinău and Moldova (belonging to the Russian Orthodox Church), according to the State Service on Religious Issues, has 1,194 parishes; the autonomous Metropolis of Bessarabia (belonging to the Romanian Orthodox Church) has 124 parishes. Besides followers of the Russian Orthodox Old-Rite Church (Old Believers) make up approximately 0.09 per cent of the population.

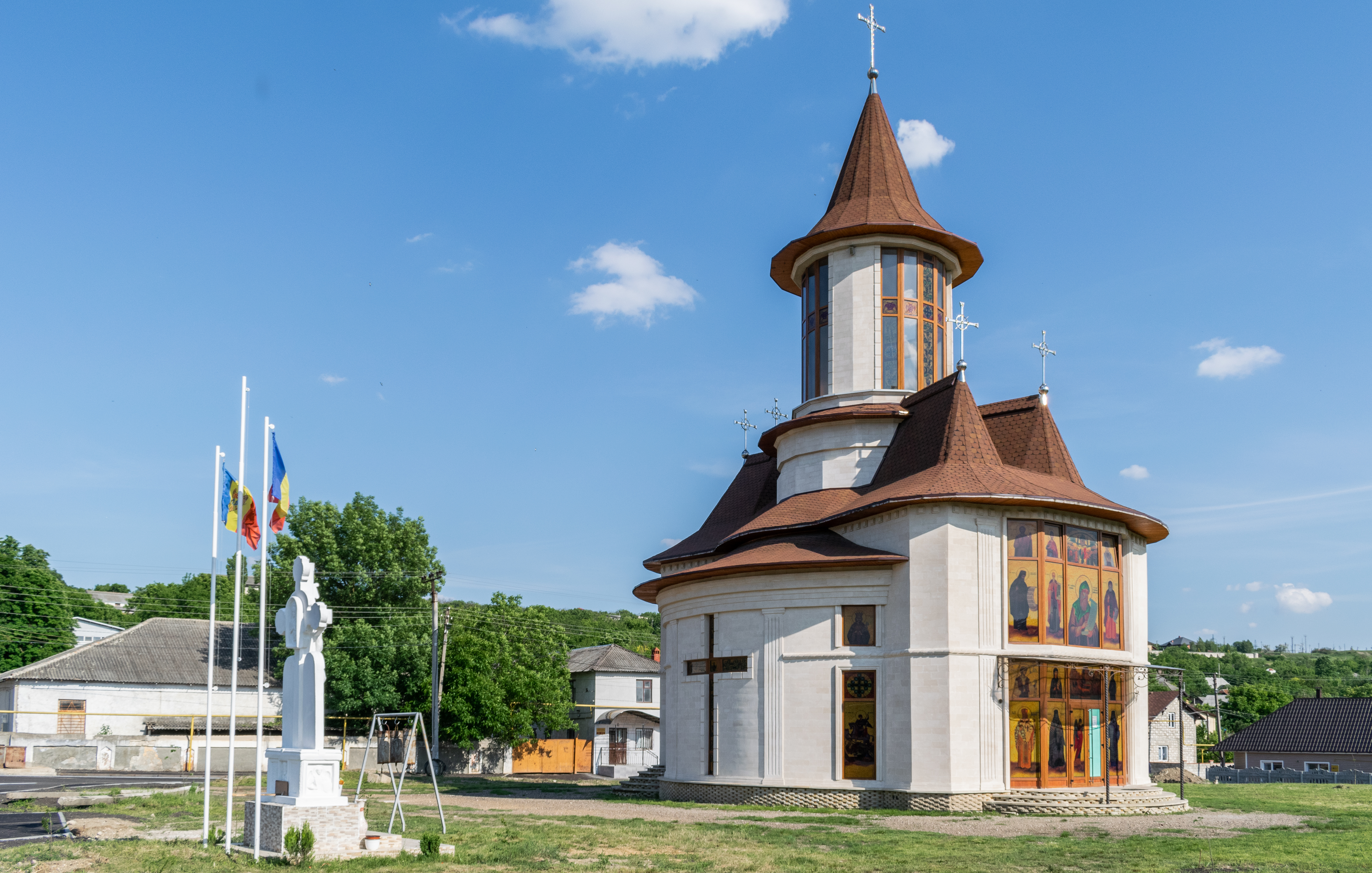
Romanian church in Orhei

During the 2004 census, 93.34 per cent of the population declared themselves to be Eastern Orthodox. 80–90 per cent of Orthodox Moldovans belong to the Moldovan Orthodox Church (formally known as Metropolis of Chișinău and All Moldova) which is subordinate to the Russian Orthodox Church, and has played a powerful role in deepening Russia's influence in Moldova. The remaining 10–20 per cent of Orthodox Moldovans belong to the Metropolis of Bessarabia, which is subordinate to the Romanian Orthodox Church.

The religious traditions of Eastern Orthodoxy are entwined with the culture and patrimony of the country. Many self-professed atheists routinely celebrate religious holidays, cross themselves, and even light candles and kiss icons if local tradition and the occasion demand.

=== Catholic Church ===
Moldova forms a single diocese, the Roman Catholic Diocese of Chişinău. It is not part of any ecclesiastical province, and therefore depends directly upon the Holy See for Metropolitan authority. About 0.5 per cent of Moldovans adhere to the Catholic faith.

=== Other denominations ===
There are also a growing number of Seventh-day Adventists, Evangelical Christians, and Lutherans. Baptists, Jehovah's Witnesses, and Pentecostals number between 15,000-30,000 each. The Church of Jesus Christ of Latter-day Saints (Mormons) has two congregations in the country, and a combined total of approximately 471 members.

== Judaism ==
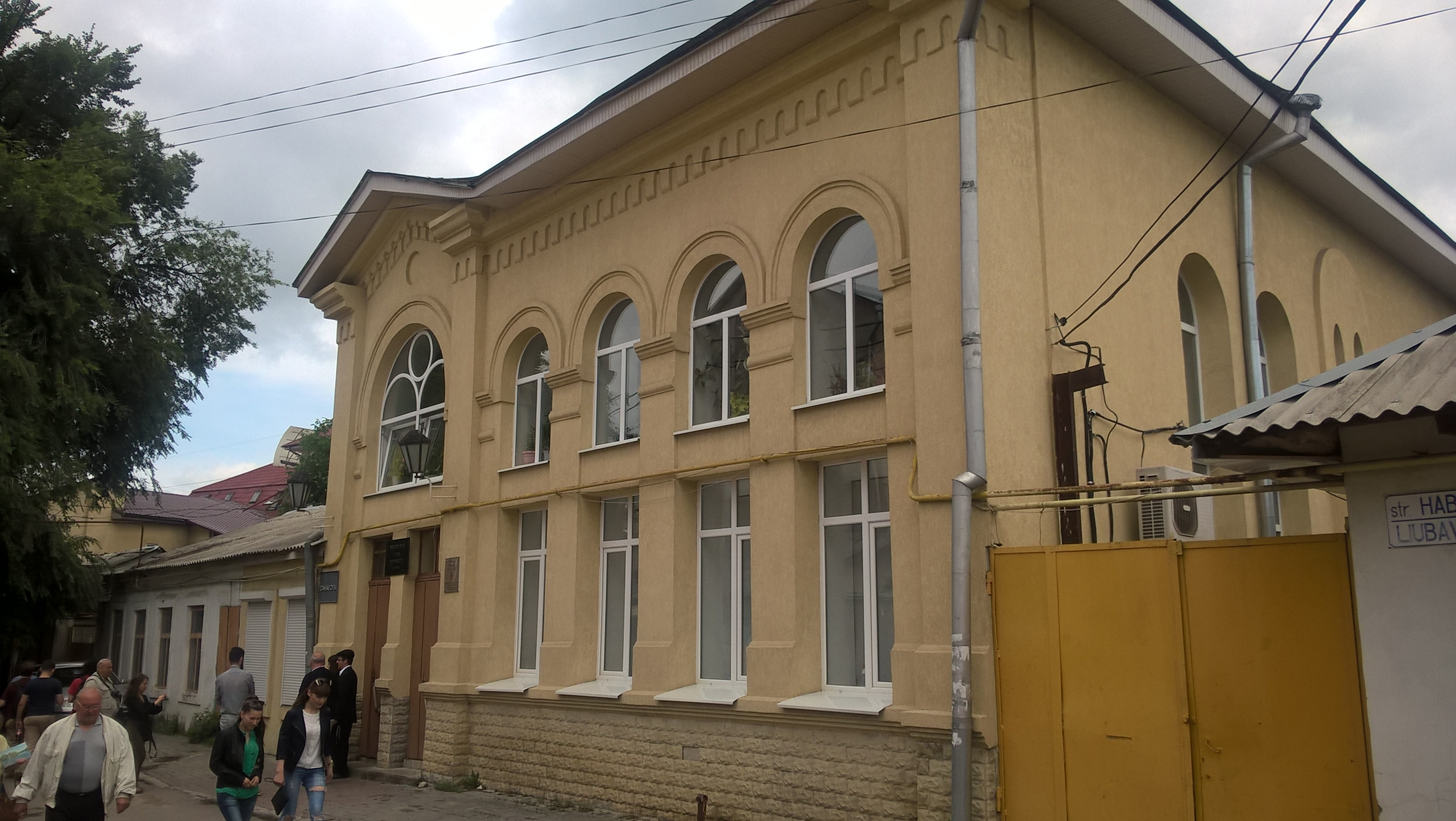
Synagogue of the Glaziers, Chișinău.

Judaism is a minority religion in Moldova, but Jews have lived in the region since the 1st century AD when Roman Jews lived in the cities of the province of Lower Moesia. Bessarabian Jews have been living in the area for some time. Between the 4th-7th centuries AD, Moldova was part of an important trading route between Asia and Europe, and bordered the Khazar Khaganate, where Judaism was the state religion. Prior to the Second World War, violent antisemitic movements across the Bessarabian region badly affected the region's Jewish population. In the 1930s and 40s, under the Romanian governments of Octavian Goga and Ion Antonescu, government-directed pogroms and mass deportations led to the concentration and extermination of Jewish citizens followed, leading to the extermination of between 45,000-60,000 Jews across Bessarabia. The total number of Romanian and Ukrainian Jews who perished in territories under Romanian administration is between 280,000 and 380,000.

Today, the Jewish community in Moldova has been revived and are primarily represented by the Jewish Community of the Republic of Moldova (JCM) organisation. The group was registered in its current form in 1997, but its roots stretch back to founding of the Union of Jewish Communities in Bessarabia on 3 November 1935.

The World Jewish Congress (of which the JCM is an affiliate member) states that there has been "a widespread development of a national self-consciousness and a return to their roots by the Jews of Moldova, with Jewish identity and culture being celebrated in a number of forms". Diplomatic relations with Israel began in 1992 and the Israeli consulate is located in the capital city, Chişinău. Since 2014, Moldova has been an observer country to the International Holocaust Remembrance Alliance, and since 2019 has adopted the IHRA Working Definition of Antisemitism for official use. The Museum of Jewish History was opened in Orhei on 30 January 2023.

== Islam ==
The Islamic League of Moldova (Liga Islamică din Moldova) was registered with Moldova's Ministry of Justice in March 2011 and therefore received official government recognition of its role as a representative of Moldova's Muslim community. It is the first legally recognised Muslim association in Moldova. There is one mosque in Moldova, located in the capital city, Chişinău.

Although the Constitution of Moldova protects freedom of religion in theory, in practice Muslims in Moldova often face discrimination, especially from local government and the Orthodox Church. The municipal government of Chişinău has repeatedly refused requests by the Islamic League of Moldova "allot a plot of land for the Muslim community at the state-run cemetery", in violation of Moldovan law which "provides the right to burial space in public cemeteries for all registered religious groups. The mayoralty rejected both requests sent by the community in January and in March [2022]." Prior to the groups registration in 2011, "Drop-ins by police on worship services were regularly reported, as well as alleged harassment."

Following the 2011 recognition of the Islamic League of Moldova, the Bishop of the Metropolis of Chișinău and All Moldova, Vladimir (Cantarean), described the formal recognition of the Muslim association as "a humiliation" for Moldova's Christians. "Other senior church officials suggested that the Muslim association will seek to "cause trouble" in Moldova." Former President of Moldova, Vladimir Voronin, also condemned the registration. Members of the Moldovan public organised a protest march in May of 2011. Attenders of the rally made Islamophobic claims that "the Muslims are like a virus. If you let in just a few they will multiply," and that "Muslims would introduce polygamy and "harems" to Moldova. And a priest named Gheorghe was quoted by local media as saying at the rally that the Muslims "are all instructed in terrorism."

Nevertheless, as of 2016, the Office of the United Nations High Commissioner for Human Rights concluded that Muslims are "thriving" in Moldova. Following the personal involvement of United Nations Special Rapporteur on Freedom of Religion or Belief Heiner Bielefeldt after these protests, as well as the personal actions of Minister of Justice, Alexandru Tonase, the situation was calmed down and the protests came to an end. Veaceslav Balan, UN Human Rights Office Coordinator in Moldova said that Islamophobia is still, however, "a major challenge facing Muslims today in the country."

== Attitudes towards religion ==
According to a survey conducted in 2014, by the Institute of Public Policy in Moldova, 80 per cent of the respondents show a high degree of trust in the Church as an institution, but 85 per cent consider that the church should remain separate from the political sphere and 76 per cent consider that the church should not become involved with governmental issues.

Also, the survey showed that 58 per cent of the respondents go to church less than once per month and ten per cent do not go at all.

== Church and state ==
Although the Constitution declares the separation of church and state, the Moldovan Orthodox Church (Metropolis of Chișinău and All Moldova under the Russian Orthodox Church) is sometimes active in political debate.

In June 2010 Metropolitan Vladimir featured in the campaign advertisements of Valeriu Pasat, apparently endorsing his candidacy.

In October 2015 the same Orthodox Church leveraged its authority in a failed attempt to influence the trial of former prime minister Vlad Filat, who was accused of passive corruption and traffic of influence.

In December 2015 the Metropolis of Chișinău and All Moldova challenged the State Tax Service of the Republic of Moldova, refusing to provide revenue reports, although religious organizations lost their tax-exempt status in 2013.

In 2016, on the eve of the first round of the presidential elections, metropolitan bishop Vladimir called on church members to cast their votes for Igor Dodon, the pro-Russian leader of the Party of Socialists of the Republic of Moldova. A group of Moldovan clergy of the same church, headed by bishop Marchel, later called on citizens to vote for Igor Dodon in the November election runoff, stating that the Socialist candidate supported the Orthodox Church, while his competitor Maia Sandu would fight against it.

== Statistics ==
Population of Moldova by religious group (excluding Administrative-Territorial Units of the Left Bank / Transnistria)
Religious group	census 2014		census 2024	
Religious group	Number	%	Number	%
Eastern Orthodoxy	2,350,041	90.53	2,271,105	94.27
Baptist	24,426	0.94	26,226	1.09
Jehovah's Witnesses	16,776	0.64	16,505	0.68
Pentecostal	9,504	0.37	12,606	0.52
Adventist	8,339	0.32	6,982	0.29
Evangelical	4,655	0.18	6,364	0.26
Old Believers	2,447	0.09	4,053	0.17
Catholic	2,527	0.10	2,586	0.11
Christianity (total)	2,418,715	93.18	2,346,427	97.39
Islam	1,798	0.07	3,138	0.13
Other	3,277	0.12	4,720	0.20
Agnostic / Atheist	5,800	0.22	16,768	0.69
No religion	286	0.01	20,051	0.83
Undeclared	165,895	6.39	18,103	0.75
Total	2,595,771		2,409,207	
Source: National Bureau of Statistics

== See also ==
- Baháʼí Faith in Moldova
- Catholic Church in Moldova
- Eastern Orthodoxy in Moldova
- Freedom of religion in Moldova
- History of the Jews in Moldova
- Islam in Moldova
- Protestantism in Moldova
- Religion by country
- Religion in Transnistria
- Slavic Neopaganism
- The Church of Jesus Christ of Latter-day Saints in Moldova
