= Diocese of Chișinău =

Moldovan Orthodox diocese

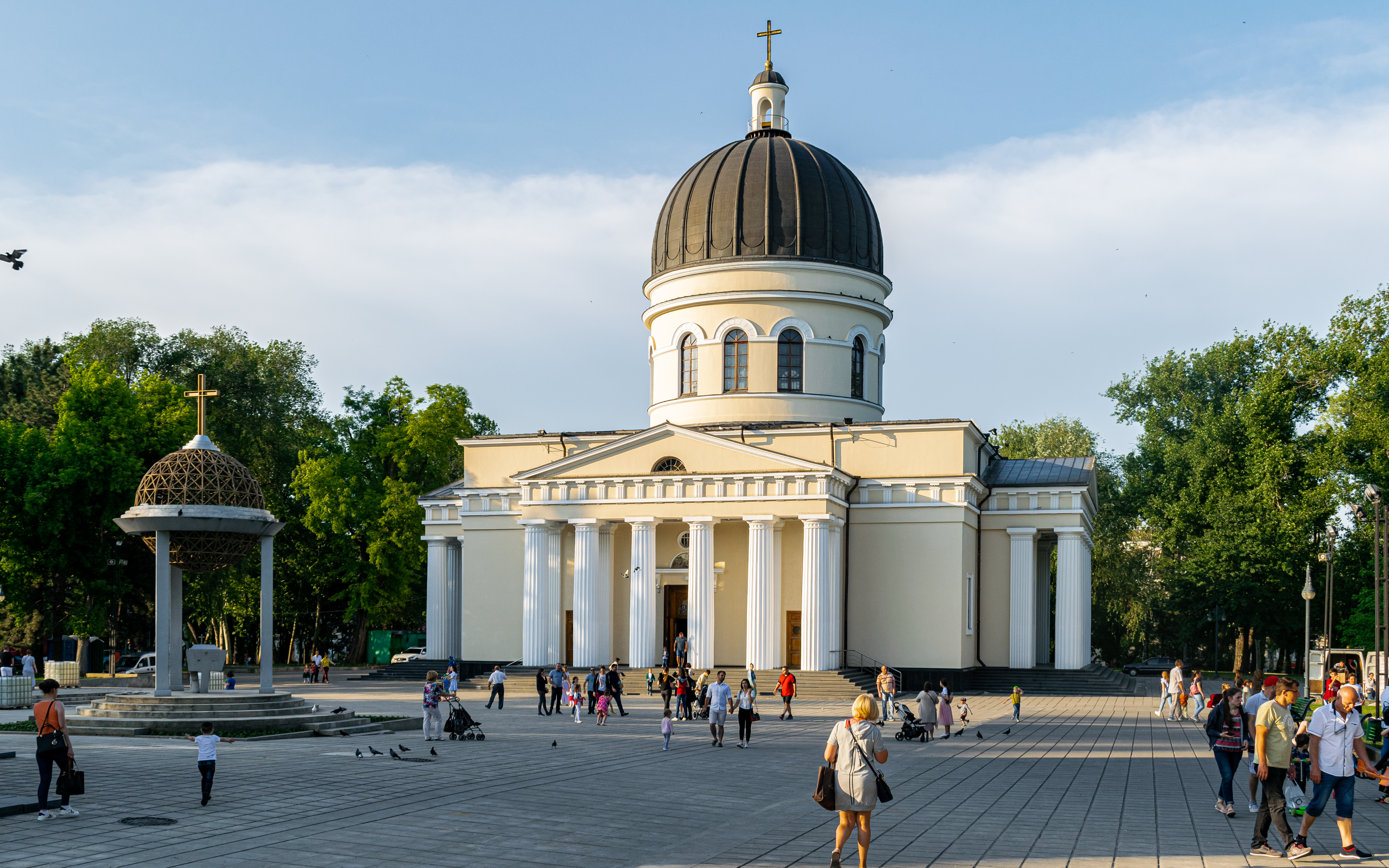

The Diocese of Chișinău (Romanian: Eparhia de Chișinău; Russian: Кишинёвская епархия) is an eparchy or diocese of the Metropolis of Chișinău and All Moldova under the Moscow Patriarchate with its seat in the capital city of Moldova, Chișinău.

== History ==
Prior to 1812, the Orthodox Church in eastern Moldavia or Bessarabia, modern day Moldova, was part of the Metropolis of Moldavia (under the Church of Constantinople). Following the annexation of Bessarabia by the Russian Empire in 1812, the Russian Orthodox Church established the Eparchy of Chișinău and Khotin under Metropolitan Gavril (Bănulescu-Bodoni) to care for the region's Orthodox Christians.

The Eparchy of Chișinău and Khotin remained part of the Russian Orthodox Church until Bessarabia's union with Romania in 1918, after which the Romanian Orthodox Church established jurisdiction over the territory following the expulsion of the then Archbishop of Chișinău, Anastasius (Gribanovsky), and reorganized the Eparchy as the Metropolis of Chișinău and Bessarabia.

In 1940, following the annexation of Bessarabia by the Soviet Union, the Moscow Patriarchate established in Chișinău a new Russian Orthodox eparchy, while the Metropolis of Bessarabia was forced to interrupt its activity.

Following Moldovan independence from the USSR, the Holy Synod of the Russian Orthodox Church granted the Church's eparchies in Moldova autonomy as the Moldovan Orthodox Church, with Archbishop Vladimir (Cantarean) of Chișinău becoming first hierarch of the Church of Moldova as Metropolitan of Chișinău and All Moldova.

== 21st century ==
As of 2010 the eparchy had 610 parishes, 24 monasteries, and 5 sketes, with 730 full-time priests and 60 deacons.

As of 2023 it was led by Vladimir Cantarean.

== Notable bishops ==
- Gavril Bănulescu-Bodoni (1812–1821)
- Seraphim (Chichagov) (1908–1914)
- Platon (Rozhdestvensky) (1914–1915)
- Anastasius (Gribanovsky) (1915–1918)
