= Baháʼí Faith in Ukraine =

The Baháʼí Faith in Ukraine began during the policy of oppression of religion in the former Soviet Union. Before that time, Ukraine, as part of the Russian Empire, would have had indirect contact with the Baháʼí Faith as far back as 1847. Following the Ukrainian diasporas, succeeding generations of ethnic Ukrainians became Baháʼís and some have interacted with Ukraine previous to development of the religion in the country which began rising as the region approached the Dissolution of the Soviet Union. As of around 2008 there were around a thousand known Baháʼís in Ukraine according to the community's national governing body, in 13 communities. International data reviewer Association of Religion Data Archives (ARDA) listed 227 Bahá'ís in 2010, and in 2021 a study found 12 Bahá'í communities in the country, placing it at among the smallest minority religions in the country. National observances of Bahá'í Holy Days had occurred in recent years.

== History of the region ==
=== As part of the Russian Empire ===
The earliest relationship between the Baháʼí Faith and Ukraine comes under the sphere of the country's history within the Russian Empire. During that time, the history stretches back to 1847 when the Russian ambassador to Tehran, Prince Dimitri Ivanovich Dolgorukov, requested that the Báb, the herald to the Baháʼí Faith who was imprisoned at Maku, be moved elsewhere; he also condemned the massacres of Iranian religionists, and asked for the release of Baháʼu'lláh, the founder of the Baháʼí Faith. In 1884 Leo Tolstoy first heard of the Baháʼí Faith and was sympathetic to some of its teachings. Also orientalist Alexander Tumansky translated some Baháʼí literature into Russian in 1899. and associated with Mírzá Abu'l-Faḍl. In the 1880s an organized community of Baháʼís was in Ashgabat and later built the first Baháʼí House of Worship in 1913-1918.

In the 1890s, the woman known as Isabella Grinevskaya settled in Odessa. In 1903 she published a play "Báb" based on the life an events of the founder of the Bábí religion which was performed in St. Petersburg in 1904 and again in 1916/7, was translated into French and Tatar, the language of the indigenous Tatars of the Crimea, and lauded by Leo Tolstoy and other reviewers at the time. In 1910 she settled in Constantinople and after meeting ʻAbdu'l-Bahá became a member of the Baháʼí Faith.

Around the same time period, (about 1910,) Albert K. Caillet, president of the Société Unitive and editor and founder of the Bulletin de la Société Unitive, published an article about 'Abdu'l-Bahá and the religion, and also announced plans for a new magazine, Revue Universelle (Universala Unuigo), which would review progressive movements including the religion. It was soon established and edited by Nikolai Sheierman in Liubotyn, Ukraine. Scholar on the Bahá'í Faith Amín Egea says: "The first article of the first issue of this periodical was dedicated to the Bahá'í Faith. Since the magazine was bilingual, the article, covering 11 pages, was printed in both Esperanto and Russian. It provided a lengthy, sympathetic and accurate introduction to the Bahá'í Faith. Among the works that the author - probably Sheierman himself - listed in the bibliography were two works in Russian: Atrpet's article "Babizm i Bekhaizm" included in his Imamat: Strana Poklonnikov Imamov (1909); and a translation into Russian of Sydney Sprague's The Story of the Bahá'í Movement (1908), which was translated by A. Kovalev from the Esperanto translation of William Mann.”

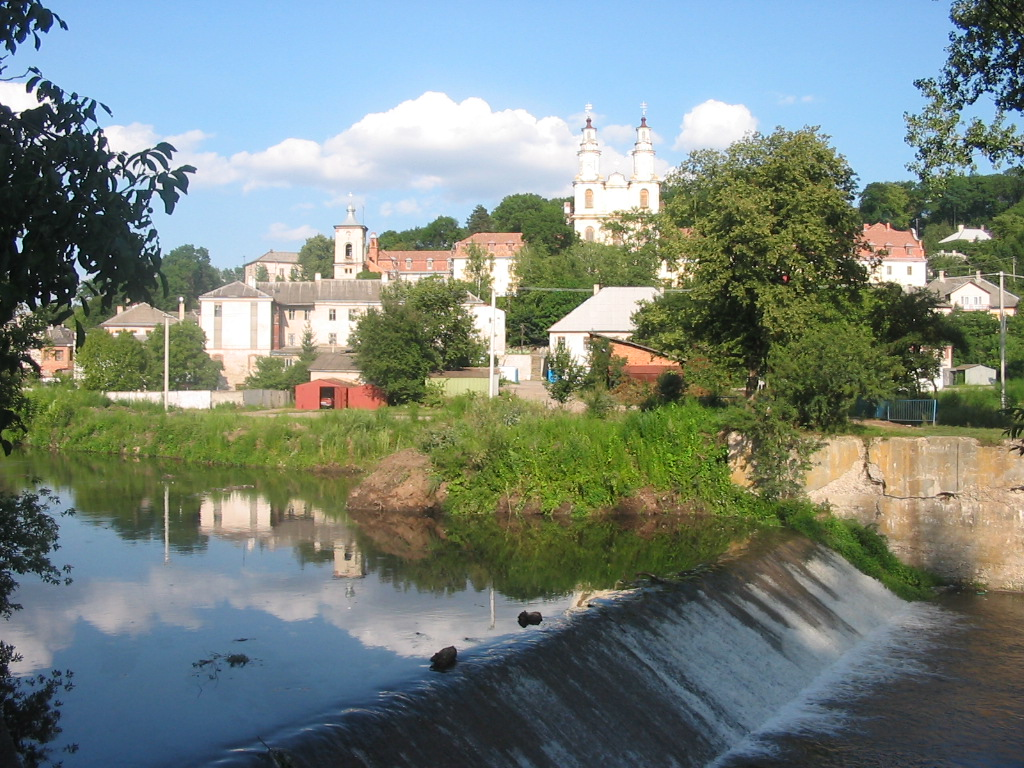
River Strypa in western Ukraine

About 1919 Alexandra (later known as "Ola" or "Oleńka") Rutowska, later Mrs. Pawłowski, who joined the religion in 1947 and became a Knight of Bahá'u'lláh in 1953 for St Pierre and Miquelon, was traveling through parts of Poland as a young lady. After leaving Cracow she came to Vyshnivchyk and traveled by the Strypa River, a region of Ukrainians although a few spoke Polish. She visited Greek Orthodox and Roman Catholic churches and the shrine at Zarvanytsia, had a memorable encounter with a deer and on another occasion in the woods with a Ukrainian peasant woman returning from working in the fields of wheat and was returning home with some urgency to feed her children and send one of them with food for her husband. In the words of her biographer, "This was a very telling encounter for Oleńka and one that she would frequently recall throughout her life. It underscored the strong bond of sympathy she felt for the peasants and servants in her life. ... Yet at the same time, in her youth she was already showing signs of the imprint of her class. A certain assumption of authority was never to leave her. All her life, even under the most trying circumstances, she could stand on her dignity. Often her democratic spirit and sympathies for the oppressed appeared at variance with her haughty manner. Her heart led, but her manner had been shaped by the circumstances of her birth."

=== Soviet period ===
==== Ukrainians in the Diaspora ====
There have been several Baháʼí connections and converts among people of the Ukrainian diasporas. During the early Soviet period, there was another connection with the Bahá'ís when a bust of 'Abdu'l-Bahá was accomplished by Nicolas Sokolnitsky, native of Kyiv, and a Ukrainian diaspora, after comments from 1936 through a visit to his studio in Paris. He was a student of Ecole des Beaux-Arts.

Anne Slastiona Lynch was of Ukrainian descent, however "While it might seem more appropriate to consider Anne Lynch the first Ukrainian Bahá’í, it was Mrs. Lynch herself who gave the distinction to Vasyl Doroshcnko."

As early as 1954 Canadian Peter Pihichyn of Ukrainian descent translated Baháʼí literature into Ukrainian and by 1963 a Ukrainian Teaching Committee of the Baháʼí National Spiritual Assembly of Canada produced a bulletin, entitled New Word.

Canadian Baháʼí Mary McCulloch was of Ukrainian descent. After becoming a Baháʼí in 1951 and being elected to the first Baháʼí Local Spiritual Assembly in Saskatoon, Saskatchewan she was the first person to relocate to promulgate the religion, (pioneer)) to Anticosti Island in 1956 becoming thereby a Knight of Baháʼu'lláh. In later years she lived in Baker Lake with her family and promoted translation of Baháʼí literature into Inuktitut. She also assisted with translations into Ukrainian. In the 1990s she attended the Observances of the Centenary of the Ascension of Baháʼu'lláh and the Baháʼí World Congress and went on pilgrimage, and died in 1995.

In 1973 an intercultural banquet was held in Minnesota hosted by Baha’is included Ukrainian food. There were encounters with diaspora Ukrainians in Paraguay by the later 1970s.

=== History of the Bahá’í Faith in Ukraine (1900s - 2000) ===
==== Early Traces and Pre-Soviet Era (1900s–1939) ====
The Bahá’í Faith's earliest known connection to Ukraine dates to the 1920s, when Mr. Abul Qasim Kiani, a student in St. Petersburg, moved to the Donbas region, becoming the first known Bahá’í in that area. The first Ukrainian Bahá’í is considered to be Vasyl Doroshenko, who was taught the Faith by Lidia Zamenhof in 1938 while living in what was then eastern Poland. Doroshenko began translating Bahá’í literature into Ukrainian, but contact was lost after the Soviet invasion during World War II.

==== The Soviet Era: Suppression and Isolation (1940s–1980s) ====
During the Soviet period, religious activity was heavily suppressed. Ukraine was named by Shoghi Effendi as a “virgin territory” to be opened during the Ten-Year Crusade (1953–1963), but no pioneers succeeded in establishing a community. There are scattered reports of Bahá’ís living or studying in Ukraine, such as Naim Nadji in Odessa in the late 1970s, but little is known about their activities. In the 1980s, a few foreign students, such as Jacob Opeid from Uganda, studied in Odessa and identified as Bahá’ís, but their presence was brief and often ended tragically due to the political climate.

==== The Dawn of Religious Freedom: Perestroika and the Fall of the Iron Curtain (Late 1980s–1991) ====
The late 1980s brought dramatic change. The Universal House of Justice, in a 1983 message, challenged European Bahá’í youth to pioneer to and serve in Eastern Europe. The subsequent period of Glasnost and Perestroika, the Chernobyl disaster (1986), and the fall of the Berlin Wall (1989) created new opportunities for religious activity.

In February 1990, Dmitry Krukov became the first Bahá’í of the new generation in Ukraine. The first pioneers, Jinus and Iradj Victory, arrived in Kiev in May 1990, followed by Riaz Rafat (June 1990) and Shamsi Sedaghat (Odessa, August 1990). The first Local Spiritual Assembly in Ukraine was formed in Kiev on 6 August 1990.

==== The First Bahá’í Activities in Kiev (1990–1991): Four Centres of Community Life ====
The re-emergence of the Bahá’í Faith in Kiev was marked by remarkable dynamism and hospitality. The growth of the Faith in the city was centred around four main “centres” of Bahá’í activity:

- The Home of Marina and Viktor Pavlov: A central gathering place for firesides, deepenings, and community events, and a hub for translation and distribution of literature.
- The Home of Elenora (Lora) Zyma and Family: Known for youth gatherings and hospitality, their apartment became a hub for both spiritual and social life.
- The Home of Jinus and Iradj Victory: Regular firesides, deepenings, and administrative gatherings took place here.
- The Student Dormitory of Riaz Rafat: Especially for university students, Riaz's dormitory room hosted study sessions and informal gatherings.

By January 1991, the number of Bahá’ís in Kiev had reached 55, with many youth and students among the new believers.

==== Key Events (1990-2000) ====
- 1990: The first Bahá’í school in the USSR was held outside Moscow. The first All-Bahá’í Conference of the USSR took place in December in Moscow, attended by over 1,000 Bahá’ís.
- 1991: The first National Spiritual Assembly of the USSR was elected in Moscow, attended by Hand of the Cause of God, Mr. Furútan.
- 1991: Official registration of the Bahá’í Community of Kiev.
- 1992: Formation of the first Regional Spiritual Assembly of Belarus, Moldova, and Ukraine in Kiev, attended by Hand of the Cause of God, Dr. A. Varga.
- 1993–1995: Annual conventions and elections of Regional Assemblies, with increasing numbers of Local Spiritual Assemblies and believers.
- 1996: Election of the first National Spiritual Assembly of Ukraine.
- 1999: Official registration of the National Spiritual Assembly of Ukraine.

By the late 1990s, the Bahá’í community in Ukraine had grown significantly, with active communities in major cities such as Kiev, Odessa, Dnepropetrovsk, Chernovtsy, Kharkov, and others.

==== The Role of International Teaching Teams and Pioneers ====
The rapid growth of the Faith in Ukraine was greatly aided by the sacrificial efforts of travel teachers and teaching teams from abroad. Notable groups included:

- Peace Ambassadors: A tour of 62 people from the US, New Zealand, Australia, and Germany in 1989, marking the first group of foreigners to visit the Soviet Union for Bahá’í teaching.
- Day-Star: A group of musicians and performers from 16 countries, visiting Ukraine annually and attracting many to the Faith.
- Marion Jack: A team of young teachers from California, conducting multiple trips and opening dozens of localities to the Faith.
- El Viento Canta: A South American music group that performed in Odessa and Kiev in 1990, inspiring the first local declarations.
- Red Grammer: An American singer whose concerts in 1990 attracted many to the Faith.

==== Early Pioneers ====
Early pioneers to Ukraine were Jinus and Iradj Victory, Riaz Rafat, Shamsi Sedaghat, Nazila Dabestani, Frank Johansen, Aram Jahanpour, Sandra Sparrow, Esther and Bill De-Tally, Roger Coe, Joanne Evans Henlen, Vafa Moshtagh, Irina and Alecia Itkinova and many others. Their efforts, often under challenging conditions, were instrumental in the formation of new communities and the development of Bahá’í institutions.

Among the first home-front pioneers and travel teachers in Ukraine, were Alina Shlyakhova, Nina Yakubova, Ludmila Gadjieva, Tatiana Kuzina, Tatiana Tretyachenko, Yuri Petukhov, Lidia Dubeniuk, Liana Tushniakova and many others.

==== The Bahá’í Community at the Turn of the Millennium ====
By 2000, the Bahá’í Faith in Ukraine expanded by establishing National Spiritual Assembly and multiple Local Spiritual Assemblies, active communities in over 30 cities and towns, a network of dedicated pioneers, travel teachers, local believers, and on-going projects in education, social development, and interfaith dialogue.

==== Source ====
https://drive.google.com/file/d/1Tty0sNim-0DfsxdI-DRG10KnOwWLFpTs/view

==== Inside Ukraine ====
In the second half of 1938 Lidia Zamenhof had been a major influence on the conversion of the first known Ukrainian becoming a Baháʼí, who was living in eastern Poland at the time. Vasyl Doroshenko was an Esperantist and a teacher but by 1938 had retired and was living in the country near Kremenets which was then part of Poland. Dorosenko was much affected by Russian and Esperantist language versions of Baháʼu'lláh and the New Era by John Esslemont. He did early work in translating it to the Ukrainian language. However, after Zamenhof's visit in early 1939 he became ill and all contact was lost. In early 1939, she traveled around Poland presenting the religion and encountered some who converted to the religion and in particular met Vasyl Doroshenko and some friends of his in a study group. Doroshenko, a native Ukrainian speaker, was a retired teacher and school inspector living in the country near Kremenets, in what had been Ukrainian territory and has been called the first Ukrainian Bahá’í. That spring, Doroshenko was in a hospital and wrote a letter to Anne Lynch at the International Bahá’í Bureau in Geneva: ‘I bless the Heavenly Father for this illness and for being in the common ward with the other sufferers.... It is a preparation for another life for me, a fuller one than this.... Just received a long letter from Lidia Zamenhof - full of encouragement and love, enclosing many prayers by Baha’u’llah.’" Lynch was also of Ukrainian descent and often corresponded with him. It is not known for certain what happened to Doroshenko. After eastern Poland was invaded by the Soviet Union early in the war, communication was cut off and no word was ever heard again.

There are some periods of documentation of mention of Ukraine in American Bahá’í periodicals across some of the 1950s-1990s. Though Baháʼís had managed to enter various countries of the Eastern Bloc through the 1950s, there is no known Baháʼí presence in Ukraine from this period, though the head of the religion at the time, Shoghi Effendi, included Ukraine in a list of places where no Baháʼís had pioneered had been yet in 1952 and again in 1953. The country continued to be unlisted in a published list of ‘’Knights of Baha’u’llah’' as of 1970.

The Baháʼí Faith started to grow across the Soviet Union in the latter 1980s especially around the time from Perestroika and the Glasnost Soviet policy. In March 1986 the message of the Universal House of Justice, international head of the religion, entitled The Promise of World Peace had been given to the Ukrainian representative to the UN, Gunnadi Oudovenko. A month long march promoted by Bahá'ís traveled from Odessa to Kyiv run by International Peace Walk Inc. in the later summer of 1988. Baha'is from Finland met with Soviet representatives including from Ukraine in Murmansk, Russia, in July 1989.

Around the time of the Dissolution of the Soviet Union, one of the people to join the religion in the country just before the Two Year Plan (1990-1992) was a sixteen-year-old boy who immediately taught his mother what he had learned. A few months later, she enrolled and set in motion the Russian film project about the Faith. She in turn taught her parents who brought nine residents of their Ukrainian Village into the Faith. Additionally one university student in Ukraine, who was not a Bahá’í, received the highest mark in his class for his presentation on the religion in a course called “Scientific Atheism”. The student had discovered the teachings of the religion when he volunteered to help guide a group of traveling promoter of the religion, (teacher). He read all the books he was given and prepared a thirty-minute oral presentation which won the praise of his professor. During this time the National Spiritual Assembly of the United States was given responsibility for the promotion of the religion across several countries including Ukraine in the Two Year Plan. Ukrainians were among the documented visitors to the Lotus Temple in India by 1990. A second school was planned for Moscow in August and the goal of raising a national assembly was a goal of the US for 1990. The Baha'is supported an initiative by the United States Institute of Peace founded by the US Congress to study conflict history in Ukraine among other sessions. The first Baha'i weekend school was organized in Moscow with participants from Ukraine was held by July 1990. A goal of the plan of was of 100 traveling "teachers", promoters of the religion, had reached 80 recognized, while a goal of 4 short term and 2 long term pioneers remained unfilled by Nov 1990. By May 1991 there were 97 of the 100 goal.

Paul Semenoff and Lynda Godwin were noteworthy for their early work. A number of initiatives were developed:

- two international women's forums which allowed Bahá’ís and non-Bahá’ís from different backgrounds to share their ideas about the issues facing women
- two business seminars in Ukraine to share the Bahá’í principles related to economics and ethics. One attendee continued to think deeply about what he had learned. He began abstaining from the use of alcohol and then made the major decision to resign his membership in the Communist Party, a move that would cause him to lose his job as manager at a large plant. He formed the goal of creating his own business based on the principles learned at the Bahá’í forum. He also decided that although he would like his family members to become Bahá’ís, and that according to tradition he could issue this decree, he would instead expose them to the teachings and let them reach their own conclusions. “My whole family will be Bahá’í someday but it must be When they discover it in their hearts,” he said.
- tours of the musical performers Red Grammer, El Viento Canta, and Daystar.
- a group of youth from the United States formed the Marion Jack Teaching Project in the summer of 1990, carrying 10,000 copies of The Promise of World Peace and 2,000 copies of The Hidden Words in Russian, the youth travelled from Ukraine to Siberia. A second Marion Jack Project was organized for January 1991, and Marion Jack III took place that summer.
- In Ukraine, three local assemblies had been formed by 1990 as a result of the consolidation work of traveling teachers and a few pioneers. By Riḍván 1991, a Bahá'í Holy Day and the traditional time of electing institutions of the religion, the community had grown to six local assemblies and 200 members; by the end of that year, eighteen long-term pioneers were settled in various parts of the country. The Plan ended with some 250 believers in Ukraine.
- At Riḍván 1992 as a result of the teaching activity during the Two Year Plan, the Regional Spiritual Assembly of Ukraine, Belarus and Moldova was formed with its seat in Kyiv. The Hand of the Cause of God ʻAlí-Muhammad Varqá represented the Universal House of Justice at this Regional Convention. By then there were six local assemblies in Ukraine with two, Kyiv and Odesa, officially registered; one local assembly in Belarus; and one in Moldova.

There was a goal of 100 pioneers and traveling teachers to Ukraine during the Two Year Plan of which 89 had been filled - and the goal being higher than almost every region. As of July there was a goal of 4 short term pioneers who could stay some months and 2 long term pioneers that could stay some years - of which 1 short term pioneer had been settled though by August that one had left or hadn’t succeeded.

=== Independent Ukraine ===
Ukraine was opened to the Faith in 1990 with Bahá’ís pioneering to the country; Iraj and Jinus Victory from Canada and Riaz Rafat from Norway. A group was established in Kyiv and by August that year there were twenty one Bahá’ís in the city. The first Nineteen Day Feast in the country was held on 6 August 1990, during which the Local Spiritual Assembly of Kyiv was established.

By January 1991, the number of Bahá’ís in Kyiv had reached fifty five. A number of teaching trips to expand the Faith beyond Kyiv were organised, starting with Lvov, Chernovtsy, Dnepropetrovsk, Vinitsa, Chernigov, and Kirovograd. These trips were reinforced by international pioneers to Chernovtsy and Lvov.

Following the Declaration of Independence of Ukraine in late summer 1991 when she was about 16 years old, Melissa Peterson traveled through the former Soviet Union to Ukraine, following which she took further trips to Eastern Europe and then Siberia.

Participants in the regional convention for its national assembly was held in Odesa, Ukraine, from 14 to 16 February, 1992. Ukraine along with Belarus and Moldova formed a National Spiritual Assembly in 1992. The first Ukrainian pioneer settled in Minsk in early 1992. The Baha'is of the former Soviet Union held a conference for the Day of the Covenant in November 1992 including participants from Ukraine during which a satellite link was held with the members of the Universal House of Justice and was covered in local news as well as cable channel. In 1992 the Christian Research Institute conducting an informal survey including "Which of the sects are creating the greatest problems?" managed to find a trace of the Baháʼí Faith. In April 1991, Ukraine, Belarus and Moldavia formed a regional National Spiritual Assembly - in 1995 Belarus established a separate National Assembly, and in 1996 Moldova did the same, leaving Ukraine having its own National Spiritual Assembly.

There was a broad sense of needing to increase Bahá'í Centers, (places for devotions, meetings, discussions,) in Ukraine during 1996-2000. Circa 2000 Bahá’í communities were encouraged to open their study groups to non-Bahá’ís including in Ukraine.

Bahá'ís in Canada noted diaspora Ukrainians among their number by 2001. Canadian travel-teacher Darioush Nikfardjam, Toronto, Ontario, is pictured in Ternopil, Ukraine, with a group called the Harmonia Club, whom he addressed on the importance of the role of mothers as the first educators of children. Mr. Nikfardjam spent two months travel-teaching in Ukraine, addressing a variety of audiences on the subjects of education, parenting, and the teaching of morality and spirituality. A Bahá'í Justice Society founded in 1986 had membership in Ukraine by 2001. Youth activities seeking volunteers out of Canada for world wide activities included Ukraine as a specific list of actions across 2001-3:

1. Summer teaching projects
2. Assist with children's classes, student societies and consolidation activities.
3. Teaching and Dance Workshop projects
4. Conducting firesides and deepings or study circles. (Couples are preferred)
5. Provide public talks on health, environment, art of consultation, non-violence, etc.

Amidst these former Canadian turned pioneer Vafa Moshtagh visited home in 2002. Bahá'ís Yuri Petukhov and his daughter Galia, two musicians from Ukraine, visited Bahá'ís in British Columbia.

In 2002 there was encouragement for Bahá'í social and economic development projects and arousing the interest of prominent people including in Ukraine. In 2003 the Universal House of Justice stated: "Though facing serious economic difficulties, the friends in the well-developed clusters in Moldova and Ukraine are contributing more generously than ever to all the funds of the Faith."

== Modern community ==
As of around 2008 there were around a thousand known Baháʼís in Ukraine according to the community's national governing body, with 12 known Baháʼí communities in 2001, and 13 in 2004. In February 2008 the Ukrainian government rose in support of a declaration by the President of Slovenia on behalf of the European Union on the deteriorating situation of the Persecution of Baháʼís in Iran. Ukraine's support of EU declarations about the Baháʼís in Iran was reprised in February 2009 following the announcement of a trial of the leadership of the Baháʼís of Iran when the Presidency of the European Union "denounced" the trial.

International data reviewer ARDA listed 227 Bahá'ís in 2010 in Ukraine.

For the observance of the bicentenary of the Birth of the Báb in 2017 a photograph of the community of Dnipro was taken, and the Museum of Religious History had a display about the Bahá'ís.

Bahá'ís also made a short film about the first days of the religion in Iran.

A profile of 'Abdu'l-Bahá was published in July, 2018 at trureligious.com.au in Ukraine, a website devoted to "Філософія і Релігієзнавство"("Philosophy and Religious Studies"), Across 2014-2019 there were a number of articles profiling the religion.

To celebrate the 100th anniversary of the observance of the Bahá'í holy day of the Ascension of 'Abdu'l-Bahá on November 28, 2021, Bahá'ís of Kyiv, Dnipro, Zaporizhzhia, and other cities, they gathered online to commemorate 'Abdul-Bahá, share stories and memories of Him, and offer prayers.

A number of films produced in the last decade have been translated into Ukrainian and posted for free. An early 2022 scholarly review of the country in 2021 before the invasion found 12 Bahá'í communities in the country in limited review not fully detailing religious minorities of the country, placing it at among the smallest minority religions of the country.

A Continental Counselor, a high office of service in the religion for the region, announced she was staying in Kyiv messaged through Facebook in late February, 2022, during the Battle of Kyiv.

== See also ==
- Religion in Ukraine
- Religion in Russia
- Religion in the Soviet Union
- Baháʼí Faith in Moldova
- Baháʼí Faith in Kazakhstan
