= Peter Păduraru =

Retired Metropolitan of Bessarabia

His Eminence Petru
- Metropolitan Emeritus of Bessarabia
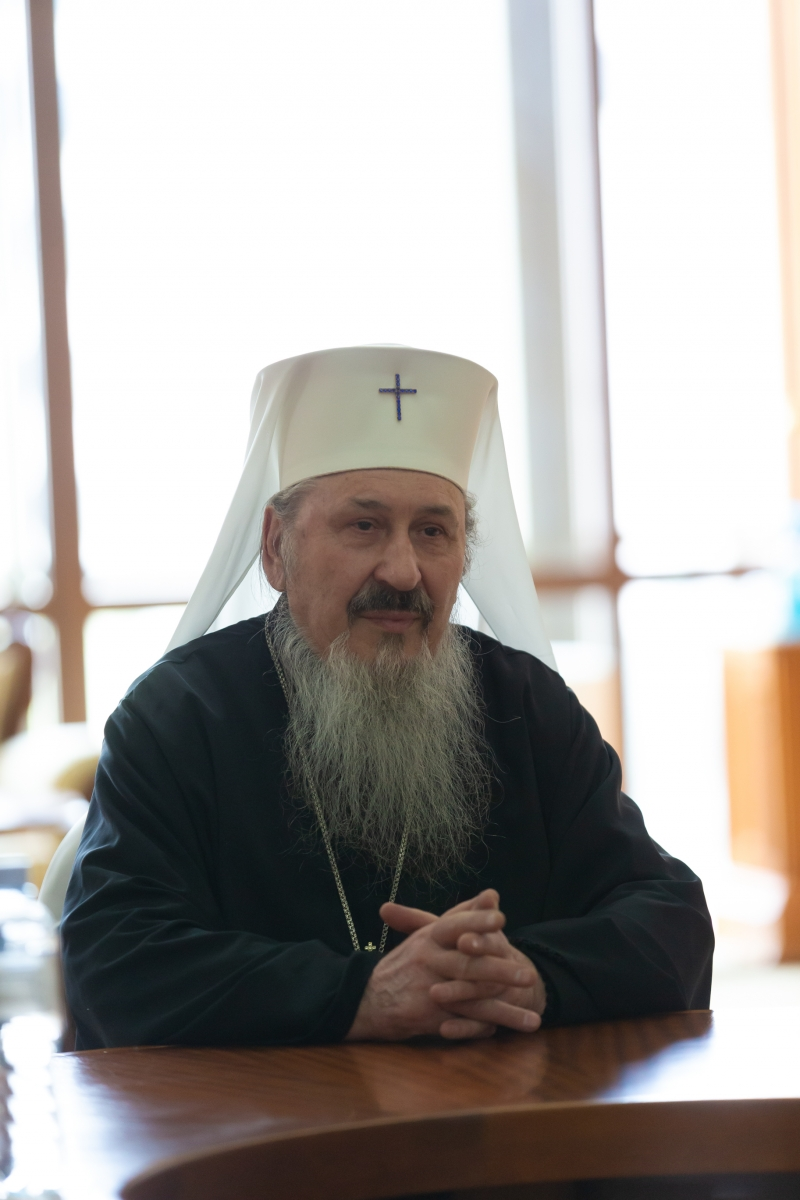
- Petru in 2022
- Native name: Petru Păduraru
- Church: Romanian Orthodox Church
- Metropolis: Metropolis of Bessarabia
- See: Chișinău
- Installed: 14 September 1992
- Term ended: 27 May 2026
- Predecessor: Vladimir Cantarean (Moldovan Orthodox Church)
- Successor: Antonie
- Previous post: Bishop of Bălți (1990-1992)

Orders
- Ordination: 23 February 1973 by Gregory Zakaliak
- Consecration: 1 September 1990 by Patriarch Alexy II of Moscow

Personal details
- Born: Ion Păduraru; 24 October 1946 (age 79) Țiganca, Moldavian SSR, Soviet Union
- Denomination: Eastern Orthodoxy

Metropolitan Emeritus Petru (Secular name: Ion Păduraru; born 24 October 1946) is a Moldovan Eastern Orthodox metropolitan and the former Metropolitan of Bessarabia of the Romanian Orthodox Church.

== Biography ==
=== Early life ===
Păduraru was born on 24 October 1946, in Țiganca, then part of the Soviet Union's Moldavian Soviet Socialist Republic, into a family of Romanian peasants.

He entered monastic life as a novice in 1968 in the Assumption Monastery in Odessa, and he was tonsured a monk on 29 March 1969. Later he was ordained a deacon on 29 December 1970, and a priest on 23 February 1973.

=== Episcopacy ===
==== Bishop of Bălți ====
On 20 July 1990 he was elected Bishop of Bălți by the Holy Synod of the Russian Orthodox Church, and was consecrated on 1 September 1990.

In the period after the breakup of the USSR and the proclamation of the independence of the Republic of Moldova, the idea was manifested that the Orthodox Church of Moldova would become a national church. Bishop Petru quickly became the leader of the national-minded movement inside the church and was persecuted by the russia-minded bishops, most notably Archbishop Vladimir (Cantarean).

==== Metropolitan of Bessarabia ====
On 14 September 1992 he was elected deputy Metropolitan of Bessarabia of the eparchy under the Romanian Orthodox Church.

On October 3, 1995, the Diocesan Assembly of the Metropolis of Bessarabia elected Petru as Metropolitan of Bessarabia.

On 24 October of the same year the Holy Synod of the Romanian Orthodox Church confirmed him as metropolitan and he was included in the Holy Synod of the Romanian Orthodox Church and granted the title "Archbishop of Chișinău, Metropolitan of Bessarabia, and Exarch of the New Lands", with the right of extraterritorial jurisdiction over Romanian and Moldovan communities in the post-Soviet countries. As a result, he began organizing parishes beyond the borders of Moldova.

In 2008, a group of 44 priests from the Metropolis of Bessarabia demanded the resignation of Metropolitan Petru, accusing him of despotism.

=== Retirement ===
On the 27th of May 2026, he submitted a request to be retired due to age and health reasons. On the same day, Patriarch Daniel accepted this request and he appointed Metropolitan Teofan, Archbishop of Iași and Metropolitan of Moldavia and Bukovina, as Locum Tenens of the Archdiocese of Chișinău and the Metropolis of Bessarabia until the canonical election of a new Archbishop of Chișinău and Metropolitan of Bessarabia.

== Awards ==
- Medal of the Ecumenical Patriarchate of Constantinople (1993)
- Jubilee Medal of the Archdiocese of Tomis (1993)
- Honorary Diploma on the occasion of the 130th anniversary of the founding of the Lower Danube Diocese (1994)
- "Literature and Art" Weekly Prize for Faith and Sacrifice Spirituality (1995, 1996)
- The Romanian Cultural Foundation Award for contributing to the affirmation of the Romanian identity of the Romanians in Bessarabia (1996)
- Title of Honorary Citizen of Galati (2000)
- "Golden Cross" - distinction of the Diocese of the Lower Danube (2002, on the feast of the city of Galati)
- "The Golden Heart" Award of the Foundation for Christian Democracy (2004)
- Order "Saint Great Martyr George" by the Diocesan Council of the Metropolitan Church of Bessarabia (2008)
- Order of Cultural Merit in rank of great officer, Romania (2008)

== See also ==
- List of members of the Holy Synod of the Romanian Orthodox Church
- Metropolis of Bessarabia

== Bibliography ==
- Jurnal Moskovskoi Patriarhii, nr. 9/1990, p. 33-35 - Numirea și hirotonirea arhimandritului Petru (Păduraru) întru episcop de Bălți;
- Alfa și Omega, nr. 17/1995, p. 1 and 3 - A fost ales Mitropolitul Basarabiei și Mitropolitul Petru, date biografice.
