= Metropolis of Chișinău and All Moldova =

Christian Orthodox Church in Moldova, under the Moscow Patriarchate

Metropolis of Chișinău and All Moldova Mitropolia Chișinăului și a întregii Moldove
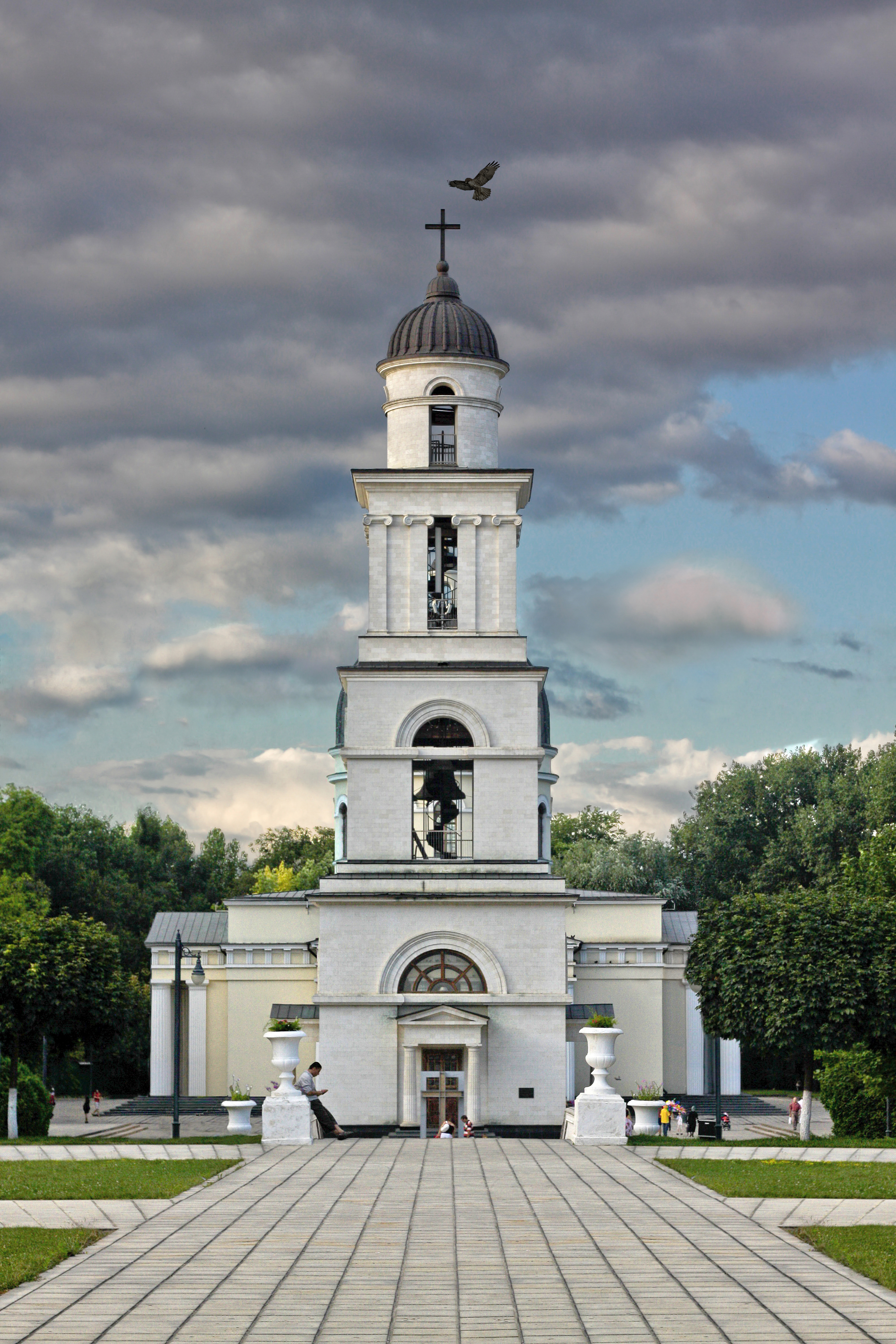
- 19th century Nativity Cathedral in Chișinău.

Location
- Territory: Moldova
- Headquarters: Chișinău, Moldova

Statistics
- Population: Total: 1,286 communities

Information
- Denomination: Eastern Orthodox
- Sui iuris church: Moscow Patriarchate (Autonomous Metropolis)
- Established: 1813/1944
- Language: Romanian, Slavonic, Gagauz
- Music: Byzantine and Russian

Current leadership
- Bishop: Metropolitan Vladimir

Website
- www.mitropolia.md

The Metropolis of Chișinău and All Moldova (Romanian: Mitropolia Chișinăului și a întregii Moldove; Russian: Кишинёвско-Молдавская митрополия, romanized: Kishinyovsko-Moldavskaya mitropoliya), also referred to as the Moldovan Orthodox Church (Romanian: Biserica Ortodoxă din Moldova; Russian: Православная церковь Молдовы, romanized: Pravoslavnaya tserkov Moldovy), is an autonomous metropolitanate under the Russian Orthodox Church. Its canonical territory is the Republic of Moldova.

The Metropolis of Chișinău and All Moldova is the largest church in the country, and one of the two main Orthodox churches in Moldova, alongside the Metropolis of Bessarabia, an autonomous metropolitanate of the Romanian Orthodox Church. In the 2004 census in Moldova 3,158,015 people or 95.5% of those declaring a religion claimed to be Eastern Orthodox Christians of all rites.

The head of the Moldovan Orthodox Church is Metropolitan Vladimir (Cantarean), who is a permanent member of the Holy Synod of the Russian Orthodox Church.

== History ==
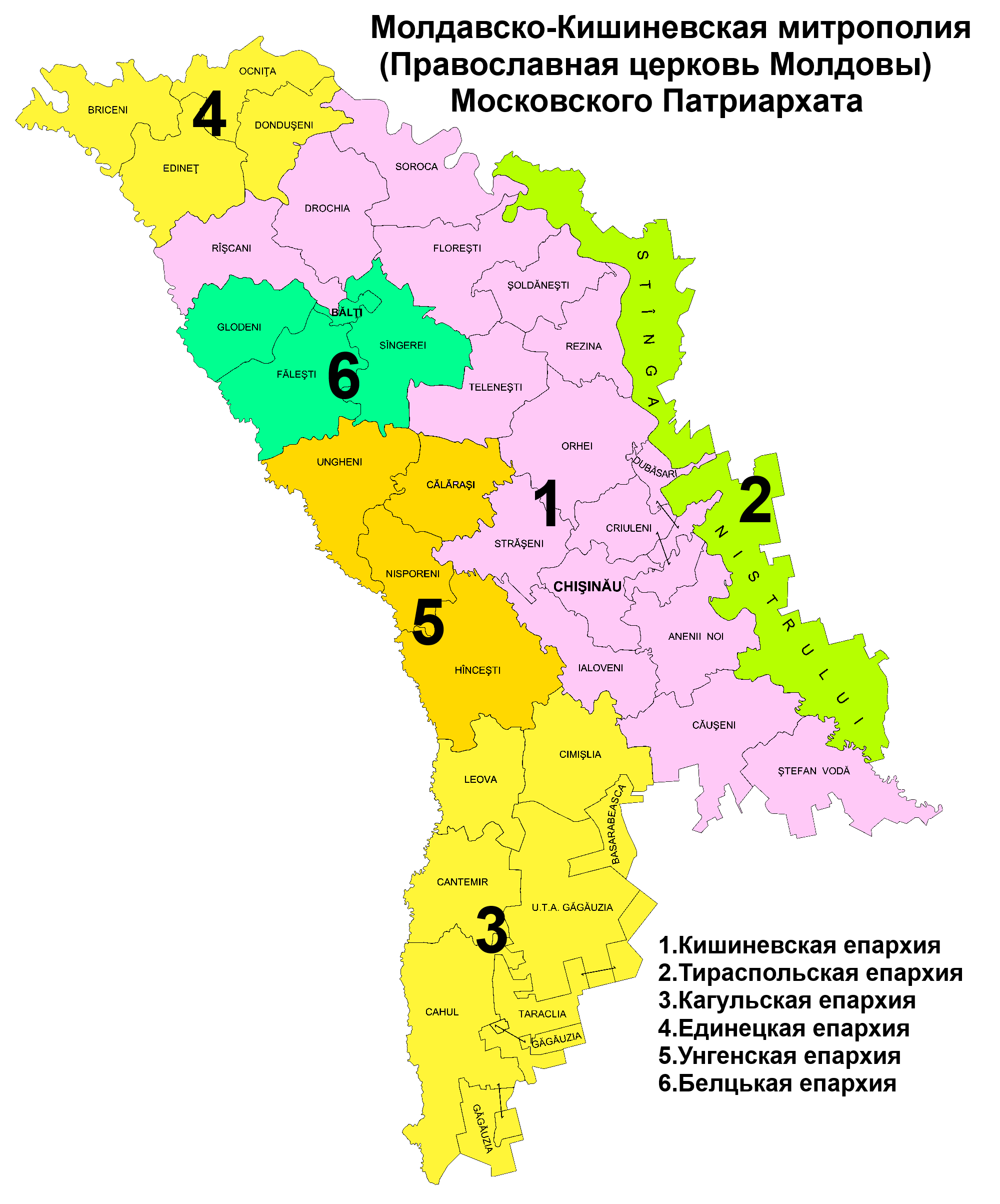
Dioceses of the Metropolis of Chișinău and All Moldova as of 2019; the map does not feature the Diocese of Soroca and Drochia

It is believed that Orthodox Christianity was first brought to Romania and Moldova by the Apostle Andrew. Be that as it may, by the 14th century the Orthodox Church in the Principality of Moldavia—today northeastern Romania, Moldova, and southwestern Ukraine—was under the authority of the Metropolitan of Galicia. In 1391, the Patriarchate of Constantinople, which had jurisdiction over the region, elected a metropolitan for the Metropolis of Moldavia specifically. By the 15th century this metropolitan was elected by the autocephalous Church of Ohrid, but following the abolition of the latter it returned to the jurisdiction of the Church of Constantinople. During this time, in the 17th century, the Metropolis of Moldavia transitioned from using Church Slavonic to Romanian language.

In 1812, the eastern half of Moldavia (renamed as Bessarabia) was annexed by the Russian Empire, which placed the Orthodox churches in this territory under the jurisdiction of the Russian Orthodox Church. In 1813, it was established the Eparchy of Kishinev (Chișinău) and Hotin, under Romanian Archbishop Gavril Bănulescu-Bodoni. After 1821, the Russian state and church started a policy of centralization and Russification that included the imposition of Church Slavonic instead of Romanian as the liturgical language, and all archbishops as Russians. However, native priests continue to serve in the rural parishes (covering most of the Moldavian population); as most did not speak Russian, attempts to establish a Russian-only seminary failed, and the rural clergy became increasingly isolated from the church leadership. Consequently, after 1867, church authorities began using both Romanian and Russian in their publications, and in 1905 there was a short-lived initiative to make Romanian the language of education.

In 1858, after southern Bessarabia was returned to Moldavia, which soon united with Wallachia to form Romania, the orthodox churches in Cahul, Bolgrad, and Ismail re-entered under the Romanian Church jurisdiction of the Metropolis of Moldavia, which established the Diocese of the Lower Danube, in 1864. In 1878, after Russia re-annexed southern Bessarabia, the Russian Church jurisdiction was reinstated.

In 1918, after the region came under Romanian rule, the Archdiocese of Kishinev came, against protests of the Russian Orthodox Church, under the subordination of the Romanian Orthodox Church. Unwilling to accept the changes that came, its bishop Anastasius Gribanovsky was replaced. In 1922, the Holy Synod of the Romanian Orthodox Church set up two more dioceses in Bessarabia—the Diocese of Hotin, seated in Bălți, and the Diocese of the Cetatea Albă, seated in Ismail—and, in 1927, the Orthodox Church in Bessarabia was raised to the rank of the Metropolis of Bessarabia. The Romanian state and church started a counter-campaign of Romanianization in order to impose Romanian as the liturgical language, and the Revised Julian calendar usage.

Following the Molotov–Ribbentrop Pact, the Soviet Union annexed Bessarabia and proclaimed the Moldavian Soviet Socialist Republic. The Metropolis of Bessarabia was forced to interrupt its activity. In the same period, the Moscow Patriarchate of the Russian Orthodox Church established on the territory of the new soviet republic a new Diocese of Kishinev. In 1990, it was raised to the rank of the Archdiocese.

A year after independence from the USSR as the Republic of Moldova in 1991, the Russian Orthodox Church granted autonomy to its jurisdiction in the new country and raised the rank of the Archdiocese to the Metropolis of Chișinău and All Moldova.

== Structure and organization ==
The Moldovan Orthodox Church claims exclusive jurisdiction over the Orthodox Church in Moldova, although this is contested by the Romanian Orthodox Church and its Metropolis of Bessarabia. The Metropolis of Chișinău and All Moldova currently consists of seven dioceses: Chișinău under Metropolitan Vladimir (Cantarean), Soroca and Drochia under Bishop Ioan (Moșneguțu), Bălți and Fălești under Bishop Marchel (Mihăescu), Cahul and Comrat under Bishop Anatolie (Botnari), Edineț and Briceni under Bishop Nicodim (Vulpe), Tiraspol and Dubăsari under Archbishop Savva (Volkov), and Ungheni and Nisporeni under Bishop Petru (Musteață), As of 2010, the Metropolis of Chișinău and All Moldova had 1,231 parishes, 46 monasteries, 9 sketes, a theological academy, and two theological seminaries served by 7 hierarchs, 1,395 priests, and 107 deacons.

Since the grant of autonomy to the Moldovan Orthodox Church by the Moscow Patriarchate, the Church has administered its local affairs through a local synod chaired by its primate, and the Church's diocesan bishops.

== Position of the Romanian Orthodox Church ==
The Romanian Orthodox Church consider that, during the time, the Russian Orthodox Church jurisdiction on the former territory of Bessarabia was an unfair and abusive act in terms of historical reality and canon law, and the jurisdiction right of the Russian Metropolis of Chișinău and All Moldova can be exercised only to the Russian ethnics of Moldova.

In the lead-up to the independence of Moldova, the Romanian Orthodox Church reactivated the interwar Metropolis of Bessarabia, granted it autonomy, and gave it authority over the Republic of Moldova and areas in southwestern Ukraine with Romanian populations. The Metropolis was started in 1992 by the Moldovan Orthodox Bishop of Bălți, Petru (Păduraru). In 2006, the Supreme Court of Justice of Moldova recognised the Autonomous Metropolis of Bessarabia, as "historical, canonical and spiritual successor of the Metropolis of Bessarabia which functioned until 1944 including".

The Metropolis of Bessarabia had 84 parishes in Moldova at the time of its organization, and is considered a schismatic organization by the Russian Orthodox Church. On the other hand, the Romanian Orthodox Church is in favour of a "peaceful coexistence and brotherly cooperation between the two Orthodox Metropolises which operate under the jurisdiction of the two sister Orthodox Patriarchies".

== See also ==
- History of the Orthodox Church in Moldova
- Metropolis of Moldavia and Bukovina
- Archbishop of Chișinău
- Religion in Moldova
- Metropolis of Bessarabia
