= Răuțel =

- Village
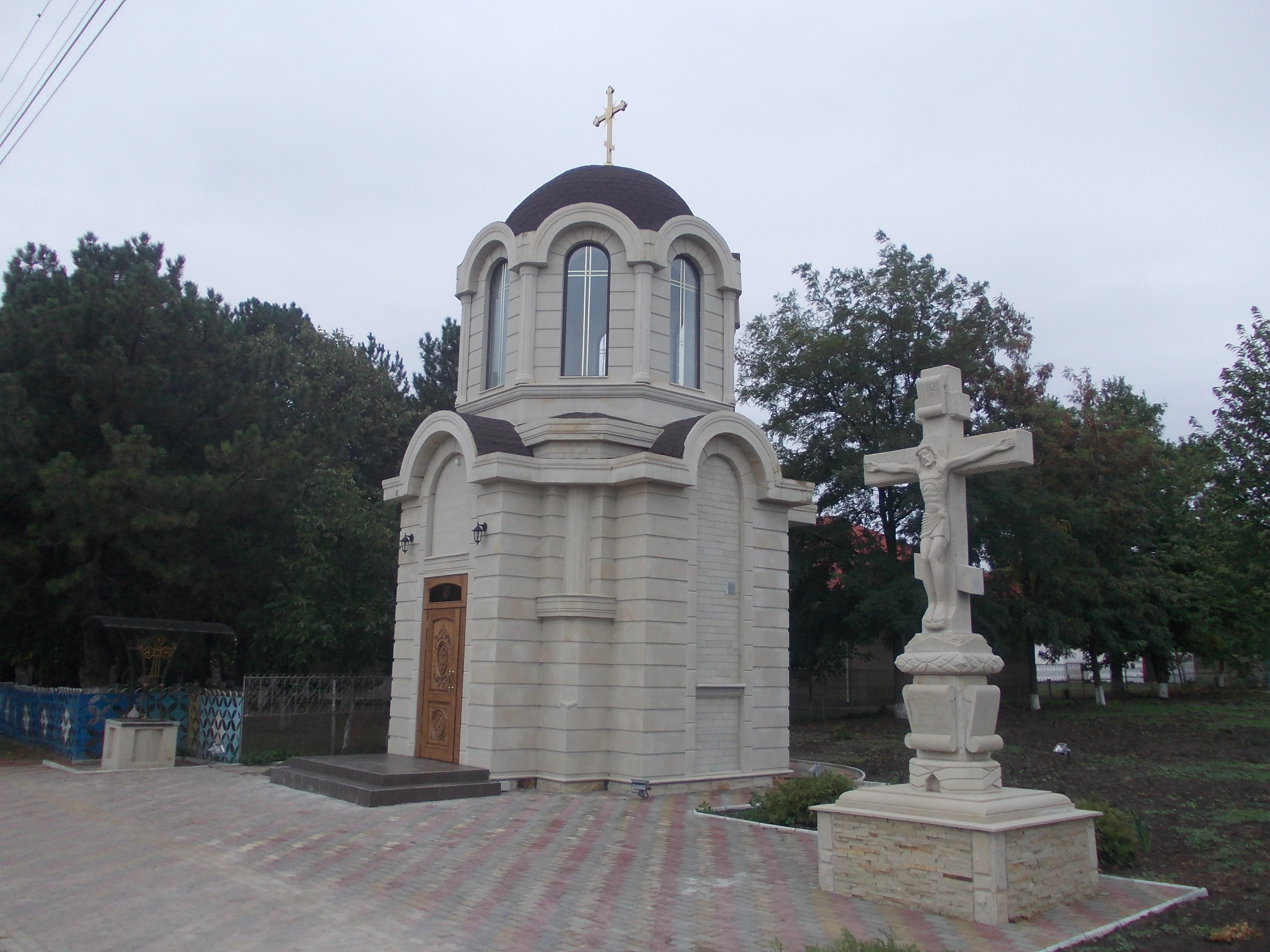

- Location within Moldova
- Coordinates: 47°43′10″N 27°49′23″E
- Country: Moldova

Government
  - Mayor: Tudor Istrati

Area
  - Total: 2.50 km^{2} (0.97 sq mi)
- Elevation: 111 m (364 ft)

Population (2014 census)
  - Total: 3,860
- Time zone: UTC+2 (EET)
  - Summer (DST): UTC+3 (EEST)
- Postal code: MD-5945

Răuțel is a village in Fălești District, Moldova.
