= Dereneu =

- Commune
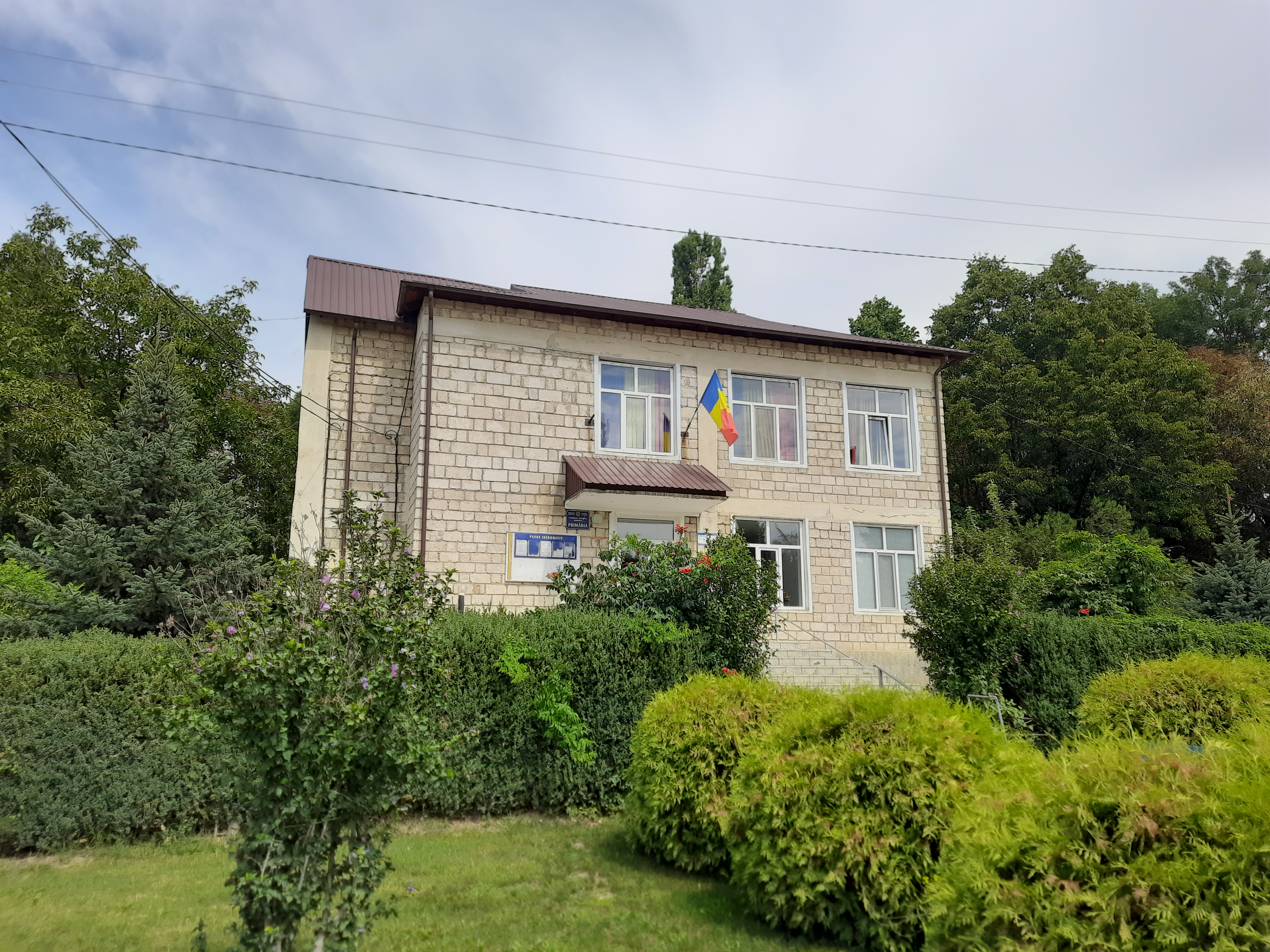
- Dereneu commune town hall

- Location within Moldova
- Coordinates: 47.3794444444°N 28.2444444444°E
- Country: Moldova
- District: Călărași

Government
  - Mayor: Morari Constantin

Population (2014)
  - Total: 1,301
- Time zone: UTC+2 (EET)
  - Summer (DST): UTC+3 (EEST)

Dereneu is a commune in Călărași District, Moldova. It is composed of three villages: Bularda, Dereneu and Duma.
