= Cimișeni =

- Village
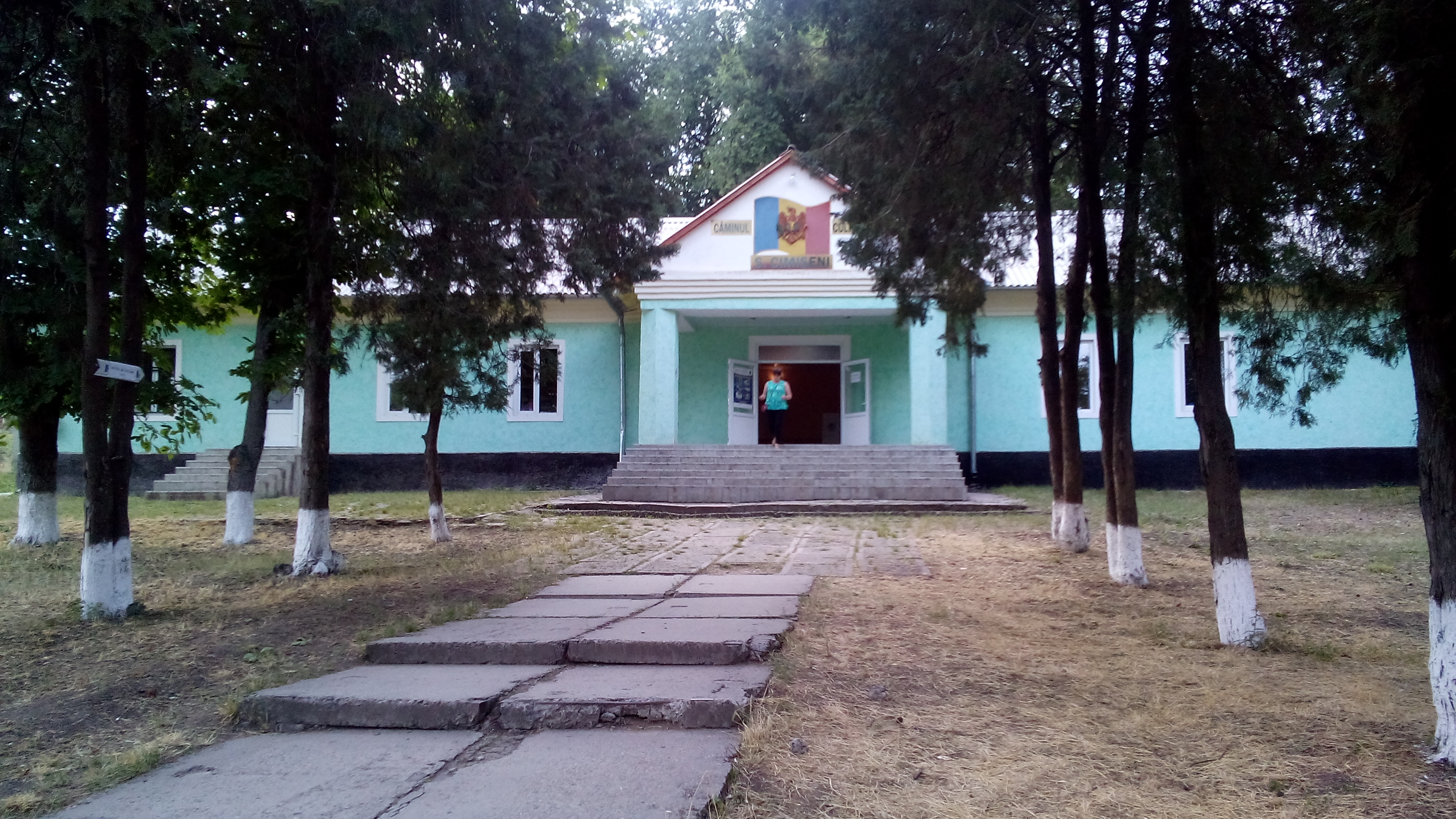

- Location within Moldova
- Coordinates: 47.0125°N 29.1297222222°E
- Country: Moldova
- District: Criuleni

Government
  - Mayor: Valentina Pisarenco (PLDM)

Population (2014 census)
  - Total: 2,708
- Time zone: UTC+2 (EET)
  - Summer (DST): UTC+3 (EEST)

Cimișeni is a village in Criuleni District, Moldova.
