= Benjamin Likhomanov =

Russian Orthodox Metropolitan of Volgograd Oblast

- Bishop of Rybinsk and Danilovsky
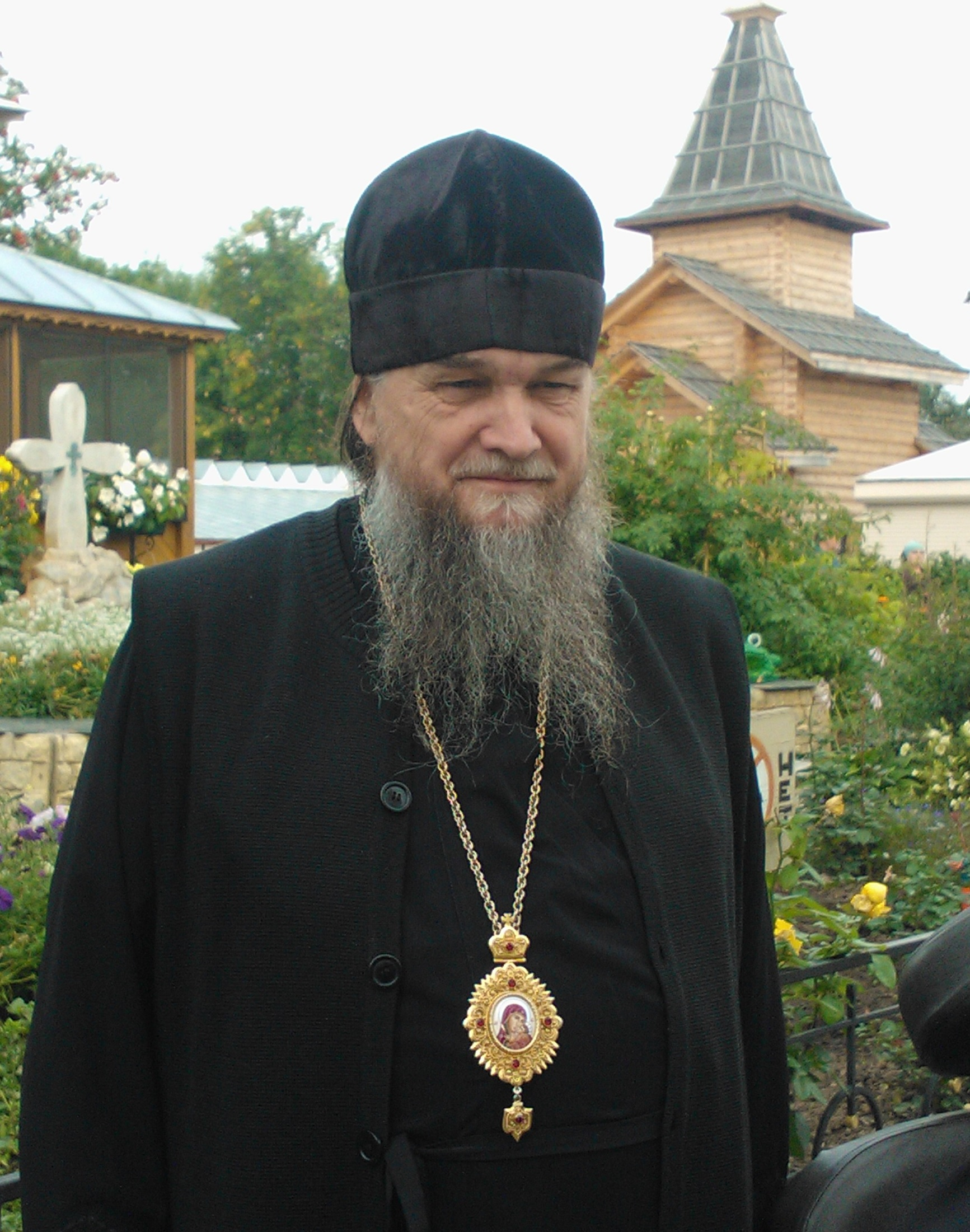
- Bishop Benjamin in 2012
- Native name: Вениамин
- Church: Russian Orthodox Church
- Metropolis: Patriarchal Exarchate in Western Europe
- Diocese: Diocese of Volgograd and Kamyshinsky
- Appointed: 30 May 2019
- Successor: Incumbent

Orders
- Ordination: 8 October 1979 (deacon); 13 March 2003 (Tonsured); 22 August 2010 (Bishop)
- Rank: Bishop

Personal details
- Born: Nikolai Ivanovich Likhomanov; October 2, 1952 (age 73) Sokol, Soviet Union
- Denomination: Eastern Orthodox Church

Metropolitan Benjamin (Likhomanov) (Russian: Вениамин (Лихоманов), secular name Nikolai Ivanovich Likhomanov, Russian: Николай Иванович Лихоманов; born 2 October 1952), is a Metropolitan of the Russian Orthodox Church. He is a bishop in Volgograd Oblast and holds the title of "Bishop of Rybinsk and Danilovsky".

== Early life ==
Likhomanov was born in 1973 to a religious family in the Soviet city of Sokol. At a young age he and his family moved to the city of Marhanets in Dnipropetrovsk Oblast, in what is modern day Ukraine.

== Academic career ==
Likhomanov graduated from the high school in the city of Marganets in 1969. He then attended the MSU Faculty of Mechanics and Mathematics department of the Moscow State University, where he graduated with a degree in mechanical engineering in 1975.

From September 1975 to January 1976 he worked as an engineer at the Institute of Mathematics and Mechanics of the Kazakh Academy of Sciences in the city of Alma-Ata. There he became acquainted with the local metropolitan bishop Joseph (Chernov), which led Likhomanov to consider becoming an Orthodox priest.

From May 1976 to June 1978 he worked as a junior researcher at the All-Russian Research Institute for the Synthesis of Mineral Raw Materials in the city of Alexandrov, Vladimir Oblast. In 1978 he married Anna Nikandrovna Denisova.

As part of his religious training, Likhomanov graduated in 1985 from the Moscow Theological Seminary, and in 1999 from the Moscow Theological Academy, with a degree in the correspondence education sector.

== Religious life ==
=== As deacon ===
On 8 October 1978, he was ordained a deacon by Metropolitan of Yaroslavl and Rostov John (Wendland). One week later on 14 October Likhomanov became a presbyter and was appointment as the junior priest of the Resurrection Cathedral in Tutaev.

From 9 October 1979 until his appointment as a bishop, Likhomanov served as the minister of the church served as the rector of the Resurrection Cathedral in the city of Tutaev and the dean of churches in the Tutayevsky District.

Following his 1999 graduation from the Moscow Theological Academy he served as the rector of the Yaroslavl Theological School, a position that he would hold until 2003. In 2006, he was appointed head of the department of theology, and since 2008 served as the head of the department of theology at Yaroslavl State University.

Starting in 2002 Likhomanov became the co-chairman of the section "Orthodox local history in the education system" of the International Christmas Readings. He participated as a speaker in more than 30 scientific and educational conferences at various levels.

In 2002, with the consent from his wife, the marriage was dissolved and both petitioned for their monastic tonsure. On 13 March 2003, Likhomanov was tonsured into monasticism by Mikhei (Kharkharov), the Archbishop of Yaroslavl and Rostov. Likhomanov was given the monastic name of Benjamin in honor of the martyred Russian bishop Benjamin (Resurrection). His wife was tonsutted with the name of Abottess John and became the rector of the St. John-Mariinsky Monastery in Stavropol.

On Easter 2004, he was elevated to the rank of archimandrite.

Starting in 2007 Likhomanov served as a confessor or the Yaroslavl diocese.

=== As bishop ===
On 31 May 2010, by decision of the Holy Synod of the Russian Orthodox Church, he was elected Bishop of Rybinsk, vicar of the Yaroslavl diocese.

On 20 August 2010, at the Transfiguration Cathedral of the Solovetsky Monastery, Archimandrite Benjamin was officially named as the bishop of Rybinsk, vicar of the Yaroslavl diocese.

On 22 August 2010, on the feast day of the Cathedral of the Solovetsky Saints, Archimandrite Benjamin was ordained bishop during the Divine Liturgy at the Transfiguration Cathedral of the Solovetsky Monastery. Episcopal ordination carried out: Patriarch of Moscow and All Russia Kirill, the Metropolitan of Chișinău and All Moldova Vladimir (Cantarean), Metropolitan of Saransk and Mordovia Varsonofy Sudakov, Metropolitan of Volokolamsk Hilarion (Alfeyev), Archbishop of Rostov and Novocherkassk Panteleimon (Dolganov) , Archbishop of Sergiev Posad Theognost (Guzikov), Archbishop of Yaroslavl and Rostov Kirill (Nakonechny), Bishop of Tiraspol and Dubăsari Sabbas (Volkov), Bishop of Arkhangelsk and Kholmogorsky Tikhon (Stepanov), Bishop of Kagul and Comrat Anatolie (Botnari), Bishop of Hâncu Peter (Musteață), Bishop of Solnechnogorsk Sergius (Chashin), Bishop of Balti and Falesti Marchel (Mihăescu), Bishop of Podolsky Tikhon (Zaitsev), Bishop of Orekhovo-Zuevsky Panteleimon (Shatov).

On 15 March 2012, the Rybinsk See became vacant, and Bishop Benjamin was appointed its ruling bishop with the title "Bishop of Rybinsk and Uglich".

On 26 July 2012, after Benjamin requested it, he was approved as abbot archimandrite of the Resurrection Monastery in Uglich by the Holy Synod of the Russian Orthodox Church.

On 24 December 2015, in connection with the formation of the Pereslavl diocese, to which Uglich went, the title was changed to "Rybinsk and Danilovsky".

By the decision of the Holy Synod on 16 April 2016, Bishop Benjamin was approved as the abbot archimandrite of the Uspensky Adrianov Monastery in the village of Adrianova Sloboda, Yaroslavl Region.

Eastern Orthodox Church titles
| Preceded by German (Timofeev) | Metropolitan of Volgograd and Kamyshinsky; 28 December 2018 — | Succeeded by Incumbent |
| Preceded by Anatoly (Aksyonov) | Bishop of Pereslavl and Uglich; 26 December 2015 — 28 December 2018 | Succeeded by Feoktist (Igumnov) |
