= Theodore Kazanov =

Russian Orthodox Metropolitan of Volgograd Oblast

- Metropolitan of Volgograd and Kamyshinsky
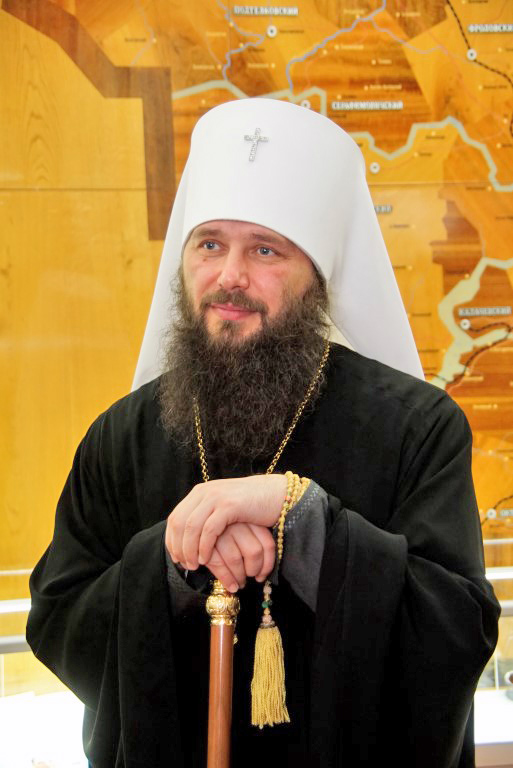
- Archbishop Theodore in February 2019
- Native name: Феодор
- Church: Russian Orthodox Church
- Diocese: Diocese of Volgograd and Kamyshinsky
- Appointed: 30 May 2019
- Successor: Incumbent

Orders
- Ordination: 2 July 2000 (deacon); 30 June 2000 (Tonsured); 27 December 2015 (Bishop)
- Rank: Metropolitan

Personal details
- Born: Nikolai Livovich Kazanov; July 10, 1973 (age 52) Yaroslavl, Soviet Union
- Denomination: Eastern Orthodox Church

Metropolitan Theodore (Russian: Митрополит Феодор, secular name Nikolai Lvovich Kazanov, Russian: Николай Львович Казанов; born 10 July 1973), is a Metropolitan of the Russian Orthodox Church. He is the archbishop of Volgograd Oblast and holds the title of "Metropolitan of Volgograd and Kamyshin".

== Early life ==
Kazanov was born in 1973 to a family of employees in the Soviet city of Yaroslavl.

== Academic career ==
In 1988, he graduated from the 8th grade of secondary school No. 33 of the city of Yaroslavl and entered the Yaroslavl College of Railway Transport with a degree in Automation - Telemechanics. In 1992, after graduating from college, he entered the Yaroslavl Polytechnic Institute, which in 1997 he would graduate with a degree in Automobiles and Automotive Economy.

From 1998 to 2000 Kazanov studied at the Yaroslavl Theological College. On 30 June 2000, Kazanov was tonsured with the mantel and bestowed the name Theodore in honor of the Saint Theodore the Black, a monk and miracle worker who preached in Smolensky and Yaroslavl. Kazanov was tonsured by Mikhei (Kharkharov), the Archbishop of Yaroslavl and Rostov.

From 2006 to 2010 he studied at the correspondence sector of the Moscow Theological Seminary.

== Religious life ==
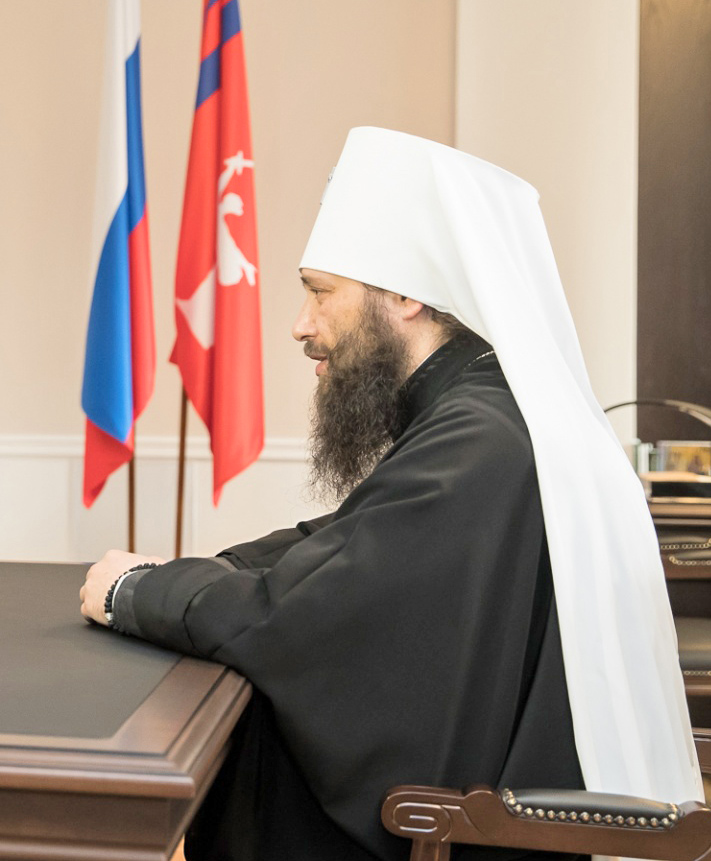
Metropolitan Theodore in February 2019

=== As Priest ===
On 2 July 2000, Theodore was ordained a deacon by Archbishop Mikhey, and on 16 July 2000 he was ordained a presbyter. From 2000 until his appointment as bishop he served in various parishes and monasteries of the Yaroslavl diocese.

In 2002 Theodore was chosen as the personal secretary for the Mikhey, the archbishop of Yaroslavl, a post he would occupy until the latter's death in 2005.

In Spring of 2007 he was elevated to the rank of hegumen on the feast of Easter. On 23 October 2007 Theodore was appointed chairman of the department for interaction with medical institutions of the Yaroslavl diocese, and on 29 April 2009 he was appointed dean of the parishes of Nekrasovsky District of the Yaroslavl Region, a post he would occupy until 22 October 2011.

By the decision of the Holy Synod of 24 December 2010, Theodore was appointed the chairman of the diocesan department for charity, social ministry and interaction with medical institutions. On 22 October 2010, without being relieved of his duties, he was appointed Acting Viceroy of the newly opened Kirillo-Afanasievsky Monastery in the city of Yaroslavl.

On 28 May 2011, without being relieved of his former duties, he was appointed rector of the Iliinsky church in the city of Yaroslavl, and on 26 July, he was rector of the bishops' courtyard of the Lazarus Church of the Four-Day City of Yaroslavl. On 5 May 2012, he was appointed rector of the hospital church of St. Blessed Matrona of Moscow at Clinical Hospital No. 5 of the city of Yaroslavl.

=== As Bishop ===
On 24 December 2015, it was decided by the Holy Synod, he was elected to be bishop of Pereslavl and Uglich. The next day on 25 December in the Church of All Saints of the Patriarchal and Synodal residences in the Danilov Monastery, Barsanuphius (Sudakov) of Saint Petersburg and Ladoga elevated him to the rank of Archimandrite.

On 26 December 2015, in the Throne Hall of the Cathedral of Christ the Savior in Moscow, archimandrite Theodore was officially nominated to be the next Bishop of Pereslavl and Uglich.

On 27 December 2015, in the Church of the Intercession of the Blessed Virgin Mary in Yasenevo, the consecration where Theodore became Bishop of Pereslavl and Uglich took place, performed by Patriarch Kirill of Moscow, Barsanuphius (Sudakov) of Saint Petersburg and Ladoga, Metropolitan Panteleimon (Dolganov) of Yaroslavl and Rostov, Metropolitan Cyril (Nakonechny) of Yekaterinburg and Verkhoturye, Bishop Theophylact (Moiseyev) of Dmitrov, Bishop Benjamin (Likhomanov) of Rybinsk and Danilov, and Bishop Sabbas (Mikheyev) of Voskresensk.

On 28 December 2018, by the decision of the Holy Synod, Theodore was appointed bishop of Volgograd and Kamyshin and head of the Volgograd Metropolis. As a result on 3 January 2019, Patriarch Kirill elevated Theadore to the rank of Metropolitan in a ceremony at the Patriarchal Assumption Cathedral of the Moscow Kremlin.

On 26 February 2019 Theodore was included in the Public Chamber of the Volgograd Region after the early termination of powers of one of the members, Bishop of Gorodishchensky and vicar of the Volgograd Diocese Andrei Igumnov.

Theodore was both praised and criticized for his response to the 2020 coronavirus, implementing many safety precautions that were recommended but not following these restrictions himself and not cancelling Easter services.

Eastern Orthodox Church titles
Preceded by German (Timofeev)	Metropolitan of Volgograd and Kamyshin; 28 December 2018 —	Succeeded by Incumbent
Preceded by Anatolius (Aksyonov)	Bishop of Pereslavl and Uglich; 26 December 2015 — 28 December 2018	Succeeded by Theoctistus (Igumnov)
