= Toporivtsi =

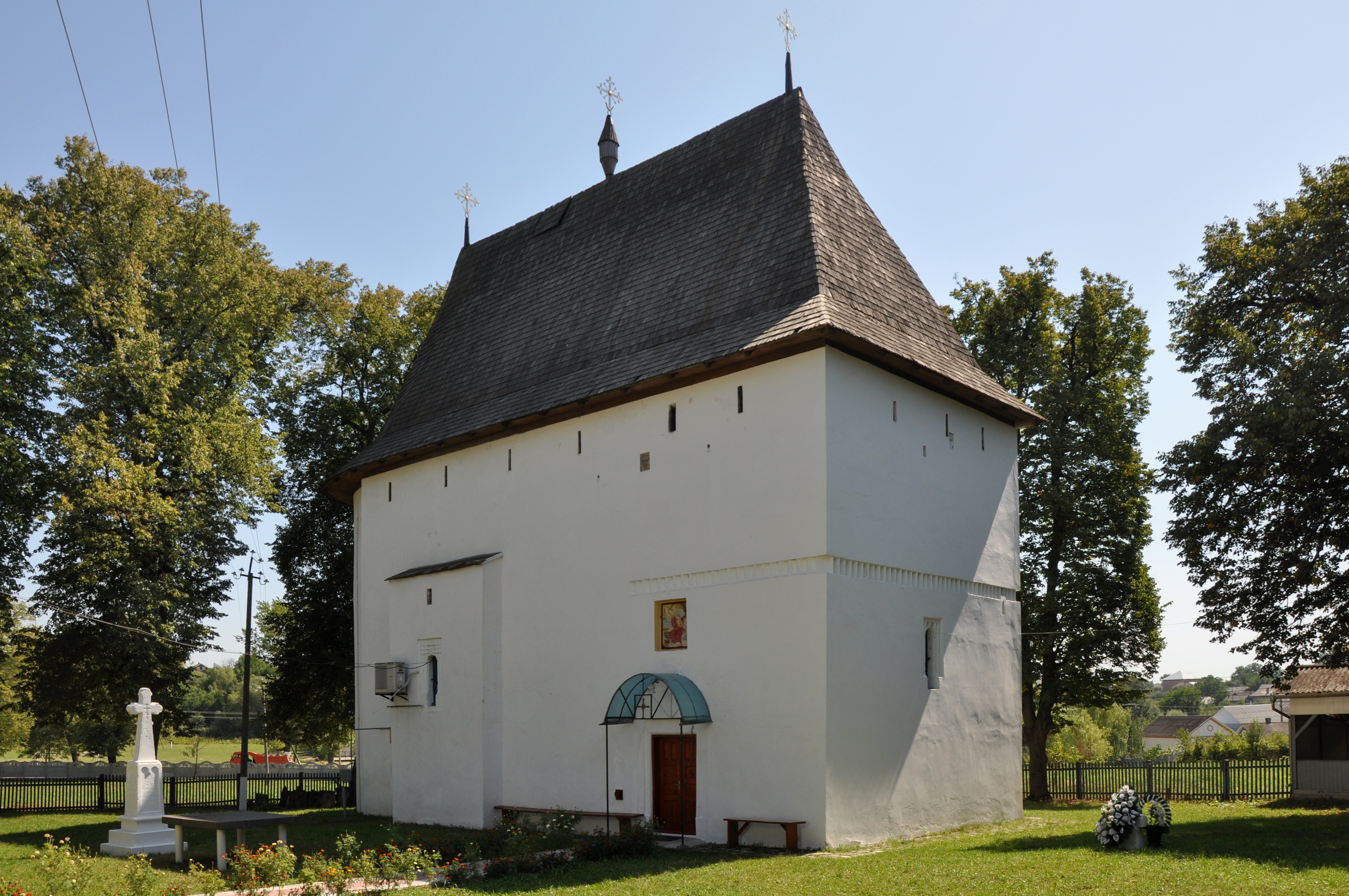

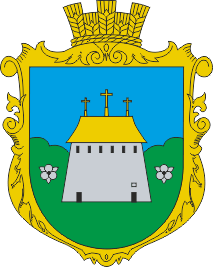
- Coat of arms
- Interactive map of Toporivtsi
- Country: Ukraine
- Oblast: Chernivtsi Oblast
- Raion: Chernivtsi Raion
- Hromada: Toporivtsi rural hromada
- First written mention: 1412
- Elevation: 233 m (764 ft)

Population
  - Total: 4,425
- Postal code: 60311

Toporivtsi (Ukrainian: Топорівці; Romanian: Toporăuți; German: Toporoutz) is a village in Chernivtsi Raion, Chernivtsi Oblast, Ukraine. It hosts the administration of Toporivtsi rural hromada, one of the hromadas of Ukraine.

Until 18 July 2020, Toporivtsi belonged to Novoselytsia Raion. The raion was abolished in July 2020 as part of the administrative reform of Ukraine, which reduced the number of raions of Chernivtsi Oblast to three. The area of Novoselytsia Raion was split between Chernivtsi and Dniester Raions, with Toporivtsi being transferred to Chernivtsi Raion. Toporivtsi rural hromada also included the villages of Hrozyntsi, Kolinkivtsi, and Bochkivtsi, which belonged to Khotyn Raion. After the reform, these villages were transferred to Chernivtsi Raion.

== Notable people ==
- Aurel Morariu (1886–1945), Romanian lawyer and politician
- Sofia Vicoveanca (born 1941), popular music singer
