= Inna Bernaziuk =

Ukrainian jurist

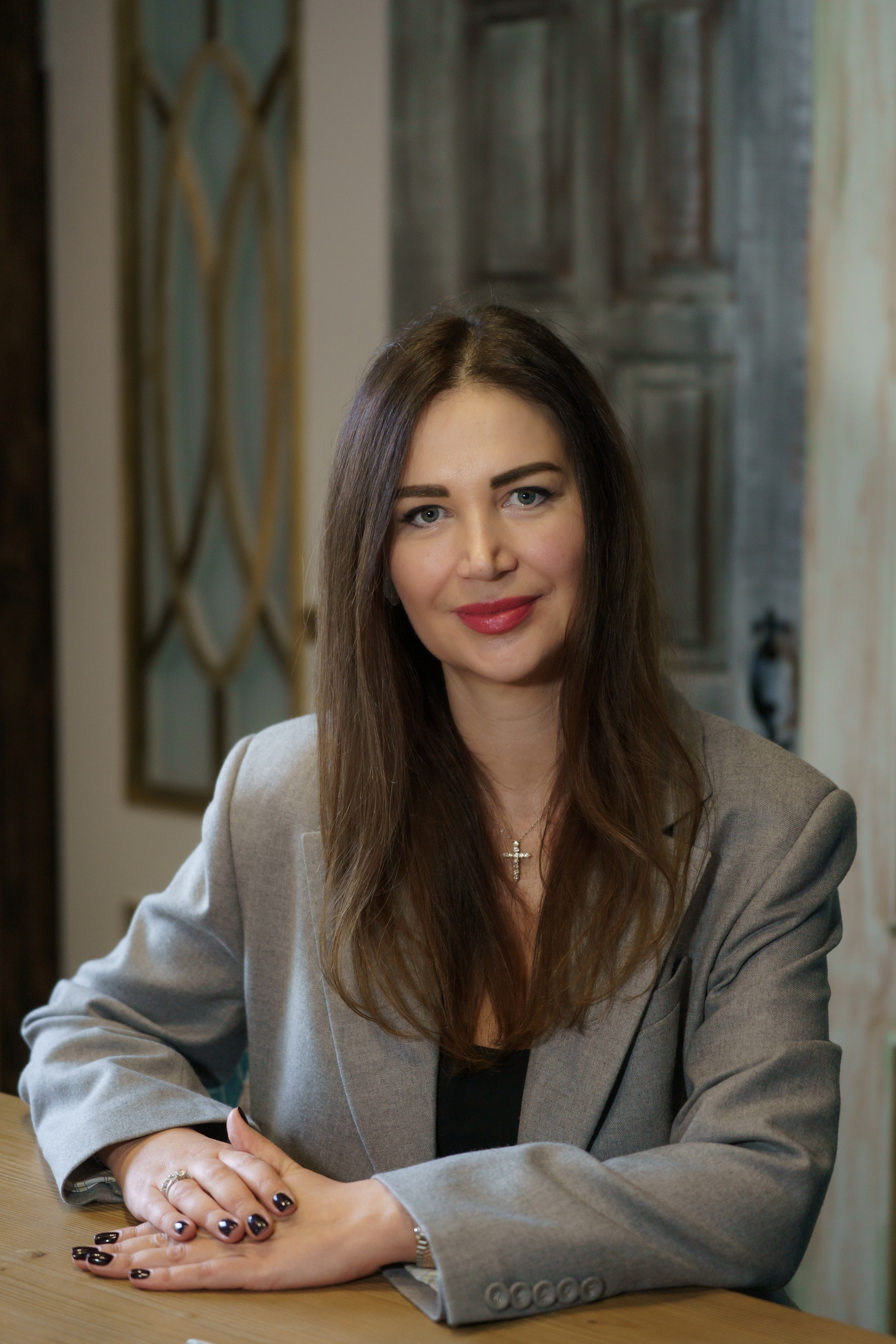
- Born: January 10, 1984 (age 42); Kolinkivtsi, Chernivtsi Oblast, Ukrainian SSR, Soviet Union
- Citizenship: Ukraine
- Education: Yuriy Fedkovych Chernivtsi National University; Banking University
- Occupations: Jurist, legal scholar, educator, lawyer
- Employer: European University
- Title: Professor of the Department of Law
- Awards: Honored Lawyer of Ukraine

Inna Mykolaivna Bernaziuk (born 10 January 1984, Kolinkivtsi, Chernivtsi Oblast) is a Ukrainian jurist, legal scholar, lawyer, and Doctor of Juridical Sciences. She is a professor at the Department of Law of the European University. She serves as the Representative of the Ukrainian Parliament Commissioner for Human Rights for personal data protection and is the Director of Government Relations at Sense Bank. In 2021, she was awarded the honorary title of Honored Lawyer of Ukraine.

== Education and academic career ==
In 2005, Bernaziuk graduated from the Yuriy Fedkovych Chernivtsi National University with a degree in Law. In 2009, she obtained a second higher education degree in Banking from the Banking University of the National Bank of Ukraine.

In 2010, she earned the degree of Candidate of Juridical Sciences after defending her dissertation entitled "Constitutional and Legal Foundations of Opposition Activities in Ukraine". In 2018, she received the degree of Doctor of Juridical Sciences with the dissertation "Constitutional and Legal Status and Implementation Mechanisms of Strategic (Programmatic) Acts".

Bernaziuk is the author of more than 80 scholarly publications. Her principal research interests include constitutional law, personal data, international law, and artificial intelligence. She is a professor in the Department of Law at the European University. She was engaged in academic and teaching activities at V. I. Vernadsky Taurida National University, where she served as a professor in the Department of Law and was a member of the editorial board of the academic journal Scientific Notes of V. I. Vernadsky Taurida National University. Series: Legal Sciences.

== Professional career ==
Bernaziuk began her professional career in 2005 in the State Tax Service of Ukraine. During her career, she has held positions at the National Bank of Ukraine, the Ministry of Justice of Ukraine, and the Central Election Commission of Ukraine.

From 2016 to 2017, she served as an adviser to the Deputy Head of the National Agency on Corruption Prevention. She participated in the methodological and informational support for the implementation of Ukraine's electronic asset declaration system and was one of the lecturers for the online course How to Submit an Electronic Declaration, developed by the National Agency on Corruption Prevention in cooperation with the United Nations Development Programme.

From 2020 to 2022, she served as a Representative of the Ukrainian Parliament Commissioner for Human Rights for personal data protection. In this capacity, she participated in drafting legislative initiatives aimed at reforming Ukraine's personal data protection framework, harmonizing Ukrainian legislation with European standards, and promoting the protection of the right to privacy in the context of digital transformation, electronic services, and information systems.

Since 2024, Bernaziuk has served as Director of Government Relations at Sense Bank. In this role, she is responsible for the bank's relations with public authorities, regulatory agencies, industry associations, and international partners.

In 2025, she completed the Board Direction programme of the Ukrainian Corporate Governance Academy (UCGA), developed in cooperation with the INSEAD Corporate Governance Centre. The programme focuses on modern supervisory board practices, strategic management, and corporate governance.

=== Activities at Sense Bank ===
Bernaziuk serves as Director of Government Relations (GR) at Sense Bank. As a representative of the bank, she is a member of the working group on state-owned banks of the Independent Association of Banks of Ukraine (NABU).

In 2026, Bernaziuk joined the jury of the annual “Top 50 Most Influential Women in Fintech” ranking organized by the Ukrainian Association of Fintech and Innovation Companies. She was presented on the jury as a government relations representative of Sense Bank.

As part of her work at the bank, she participated in events and initiatives related to investment, international cooperation, and Ukraine’s economic recovery. In April 2026, she represented Sense Bank at the EU–Ukraine Business Summit in Brussels, whose programme focused on Ukraine’s economic recovery, attracting private investment, financing, risk insurance, and cooperation between Ukrainian and European businesses.

In June of the same year, she represented the bank at the international conference “Insurance and Banking Sectors of Ukraine: Investment, Partnership and Economic Recovery” in Gdańsk, held as part of events associated with the Ukraine Recovery Conference. The conference focused on investment opportunities in Ukraine’s financial sector, international partnerships, risk insurance, and the role of banks in the country’s post-war economic recovery.

Also in 2026, Bernaziuk represented Sense Bank at the annual Superhumans Reunion event for veterans in Odesa, organized by the Superhumans Center. The event brought together veterans, their families, representatives of government institutions, civil society organizations, and partner organizations.

In 2026, she also represented Sense Bank in an interbank initiative aimed at expanding financing for enterprises in Ukraine’s defense industry and high-tech manufacturing sectors. As part of the initiative, Ukrainian banks and banking associations signed a memorandum supporting increased financing for such enterprises.

=== Personal data protection and legislative activities ===
In 2020, Bernaziuk became head of the Coordination Council for Personal Data Protection under the Ukrainian Parliament Commissioner for Human Rights, which was established to develop legislative proposals and provide expert review of issues related to personal data protection. Bernaziuk participated in drafting legislative initiatives, including a new version of the Law of Ukraine On Personal Data Protection and legislation establishing a National Commission for Personal Data Protection. She advocated for the establishment of an independent regulatory authority and the harmonization of Ukrainian legislation with the Convention for the Protection of Individuals with Regard to Automatic Processing of Personal Data and European Union standards. She also provided public explanations on the application of personal data protection legislation, including the legal grounds for the processing of personal data by public authorities.

She has also participated in initiatives related to digital transformation, including the Dii Vdoma mobile application, eHealth, video surveillance, debt collection practices, and personal data protection in the financial and education sectors. She has delivered training sessions for judges, briefings for local communities, and participated in round-table discussions on privacy and data protection.

Bernaziuk has represented Ukraine at meetings of the Council of Europe's Convention 108 Committee and CEEDPA, as well as at a meeting of the Subcommittee on Freedom, Security and Justice of the EU–Ukraine Association Committee. In 2021, she participated in a study visit to Georgia to exchange experience on personal data protection and privacy regulation.

== Honors and awards ==
- Honored Lawyer of Ukraine (2021), awarded by Presidential Decree No. 406/2021.
- Certificate of Honor of the Central Election Commission of Ukraine (2019).

== Selected publications ==
- Bernaziuk, I. M. Artificial Intelligence and Human Rights: Challenges for the European Convention on Human Rights. Analytical and Comparative Jurisprudence, no. 3, 2025, pp. 89–99.
- Bernaziuk, I. M. Artificial Intelligence in Justice: The Constitutional and Legal Perspective. Analytical and Comparative Jurisprudence, no. 2, 2025, pp. 130–137.
- Bernaziuk, I. M. Artificial Intelligence as a New Reality and Its Potential Impact on Constitutional and Legal Regulation in Ukraine. Analytical and Comparative Jurisprudence, no. 1, 2025, pp. 76–82.
- Bernaziuk, Inna (2025). "AI and Human Rights: Challenges for the European Convention on Human Rights". Constitutionalist.
- Bernaziuk, Inna M. (2026). "Artificial Intelligence in Ukraine's Anti-Corruption System: Constitutional Limits and Preventive Potential". Constitutionalist (in Ukrainian).
- Bernaziuk, Inna M. (2026). "Artificial Intelligence in the Functioning of the Lobbying Institution in Ukraine: Constitutional Principles of Transparency and Prevention of Undue Influence". Constitutionalist (in Ukrainian).
