= Morariu =

The Romanian-language surname Morariu literally meaning "miller" may refer to:

- Aurel Morariu, lawyer and politician
- Corina Morariu, Romanian American professional tennis player
- Ana Caterina Morariu, Romanian-born Italian actress
- Octavian Morariu, Romanian rugby union football player, CEO of Rugby Europe
- Viorel Morariu, Romanian rugby union football player
- Modest Morariu, Romanian poet, essayist and prose writer
