= Kamyshinsky =

Kamyshinsky (Russian: Камышинский; masculine), Kamyshinskaya (Камышинская; feminine), or Kamyshinskoye (Камышинское; neuter) is the name of several rural localities in Russia:

- Kamyshinsky (rural locality), a khutor in Sirotinsky Selsoviet of Ilovlinsky District of Volgograd Oblast
- Kamyshinskaya, a village in Partizansky Rural Okrug of Abatsky District of Tyumen Oblast
