= Metropolitan Herman =

Metropolitan Herman may refer to

- Herman of Kazan and Svyazhsk, Metropolitan of Moscow and all Russia in 1566–1568
- Herman (Swaiko), Primate of the Orthodox Church in America in 2002–2008
