= Gury of Kazan =

Gury
- Archbishop of Kazan and Svyazhsk
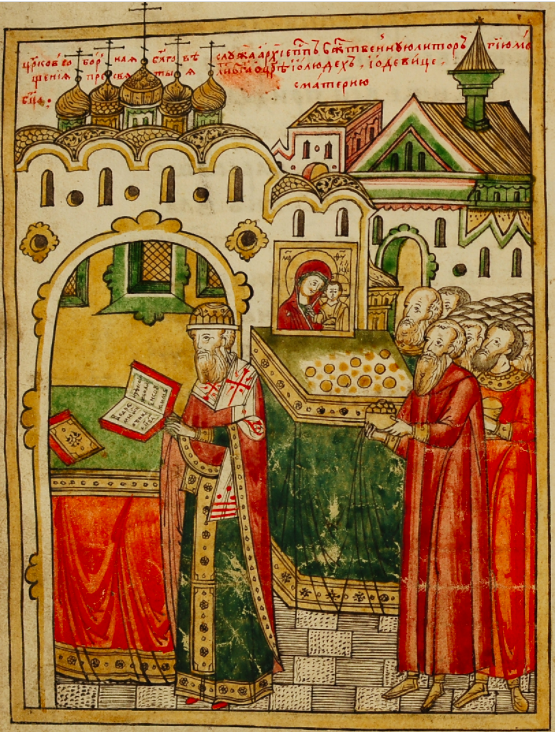
- Depiction of Archbishop Gury during a service with Our Lady of Kazan (17th century)
- Diocese: Diocese of Kazan
- Appointed: 3 February 1555
- Term ended: 5 December 1563
- Predecessor: none
- Successor: Herman of Kazan

Orders
- Consecration: before 1543

Personal details
- Born: c. 1500
- Died: 5 December 1563

Saint Gury of Kazan
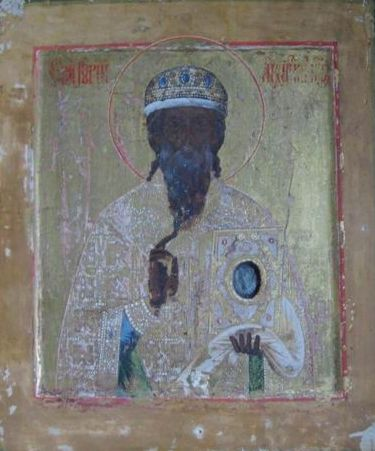
- Icon with a particle of his relics (19th century)
- Venerated in: Russian Orthodox Church

Gury of Kazan (né Grigory Grigoryevich Rugotin; c. 1500, Radonezh – 5 December 1563, Kazan), also called Gurias, was a prelate of the Russian Orthodox Church who became the first archbishop of Kazan and Svyazhsk in 1555. In the Russian Orthodox Church, he is revered as a saint.

== Sources ==
- "Гурий, архиепископ казанский" . Brockhaus and Efron Encyclopedic Dictionary (in Russian). 1906.
