= Hordivtsi =

Village in Chernivtsi Oblast, Ukraine

Coordinates: 48.5056°N 26.3336°E

Hordivtsi (Ukrainian: Гордівці; Romanian: Gordeuți) is a commune (selsoviet) in Dniester Raion, Chernivtsi Oblast, Ukraine. It belongs to Rukshyn rural hromada, one of the hromadas of Ukraine.

Until 18 July 2020, Hordivtsi belonged to Khotyn Raion. The raion was abolished in July 2020 as part of the administrative reform of Ukraine, which reduced the number of raions of Chernivtsi Oblast to three. The area of Khotyn Raion was merged into Dniester Raion.
