= Marchel Mihăescu =

Moldovan Orthodox bishop

Bishop Marchel
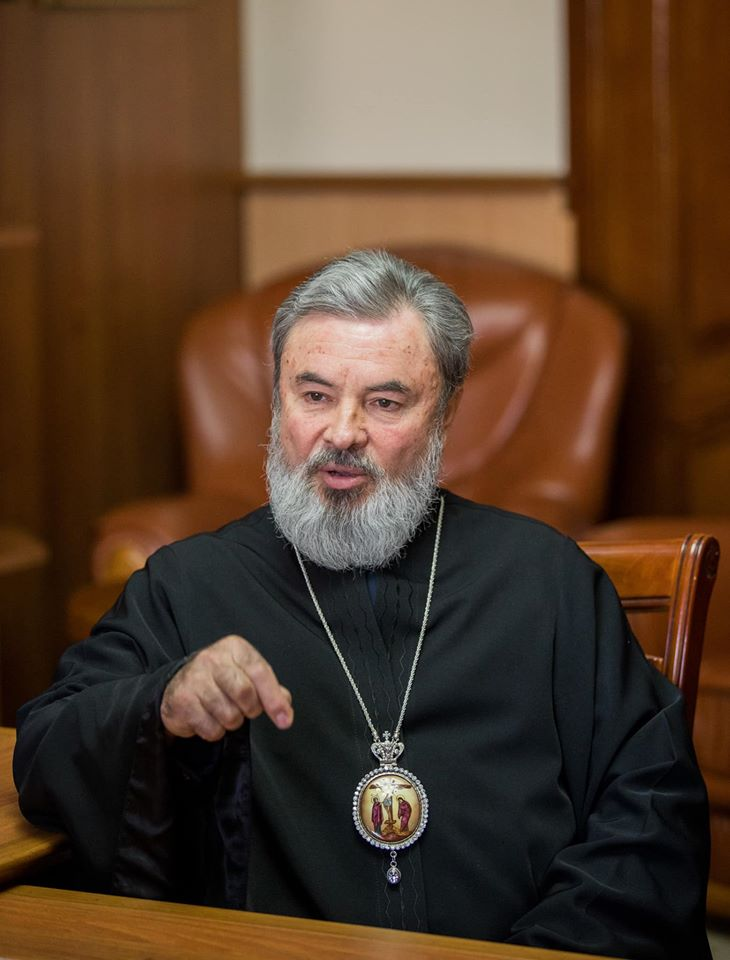
- Marchel in 2020
- Born: August 18, 1959 (age 66); Pîrlița, Fălești, Moldovan SSR
- Education: Moscow Theological Academy
- Church: Moldovan Orthodox Church
- Ordained: 1985 (deacon), 1988 (monk/priest), 2007 (bishop)
- Title: Bishop of Bălți and Făleşti

Bishop Marchel (born Nicolae Mihăescu, 18 August 1959) is a bishop of the autonomous Moldovan Orthodox Church under the Moscow Patriarchate. He serves as Bishop of Bălți and Făleşti.

== Life ==
Nicolae Mihăescu was born into a peasant family in Pîrlița, Fălești in the western Moldovan SSR. After graduating from secondary school in 1974 he trained as an auto mechanic before being drafted into the Soviet Army in 1978. In 1980, with the blessing of Archbishop Jonathan of Chisinau and Moldova Nicolae entered the Zhabsky Monastery, studying from 1981 to 1985 at the Odessa Theological Seminary.

On September 16, 1985, Archbishop Jonathan ordained Nicolae a celibate deacon. On January 3, 1988, Metropolitan Serapion of Chisinau and Moldova tonsured Fr. Dn. Nicolae a monk with the name Marchel or Marcellus. Three days later he ordained Hierodeacon Marchel to the priesthood, and appointed him abbot of the Neusypayuschih Monastery on Pascha in 1988. On November 20, 1988, he was elevated to the rank of archimandrite.

On August 26, 1992, Archbishop Vladimir of Chisinau and Moldova appointed Fr. Marchel secretary of the Balti Vicariate. On October 6, 2006, the Holy Synod of the Russian Orthodox Church elected Fr. Marchel Bishop of Balti and Falesti. He was consecrated to the episcopacy on March 11, 2007, in Moscow's Cathedral of Christ the Saviour.

== Sources ==
- Marcellus, Bishop of Balti and Falesti (Russian)
