= Diocese of Kazan =

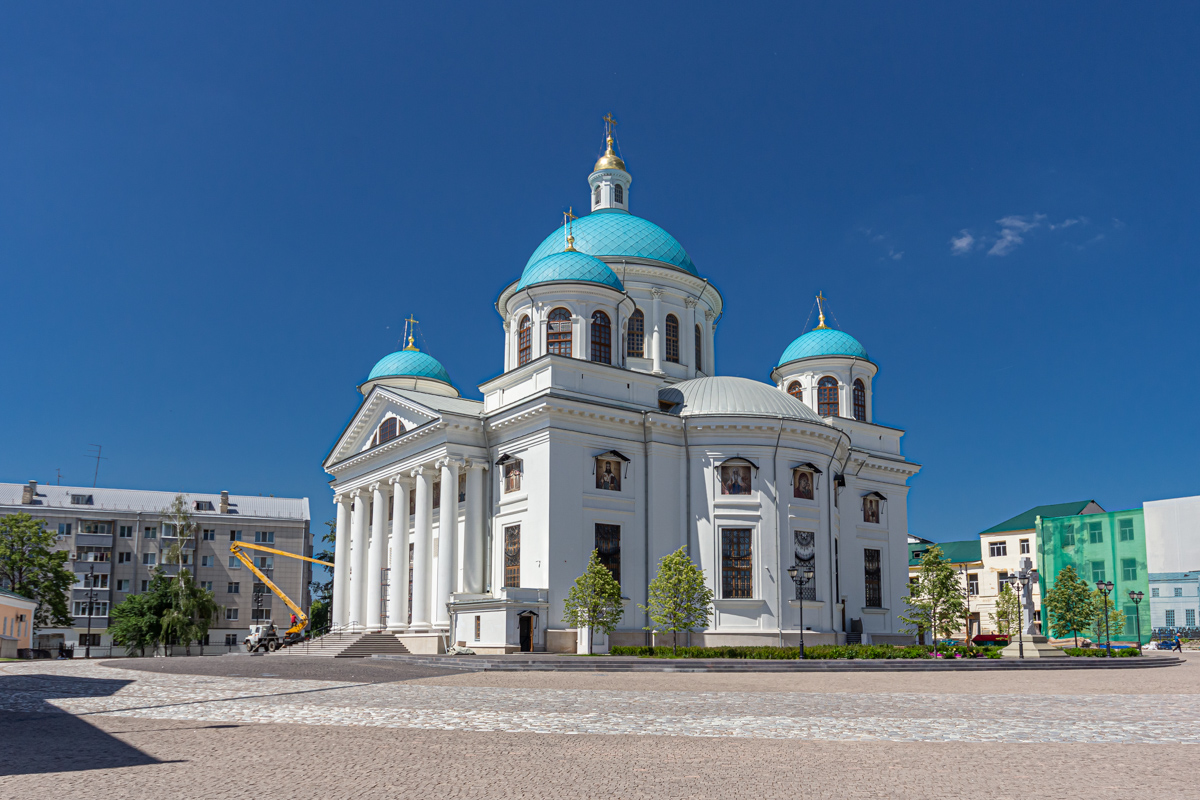
- Our Lady of Kazan Cathedral

Location
- Deaneries: 17
- Headquarters: Kazan

Statistics
- Area: 68,000 km^{2} (26,000 sq mi)
- Parishes: 176
- Churches: 255

Information
- Denomination: Eastern Orthodox
- Sui iuris church: Russian Orthodox Church
- Established: 3 April 1555
- Cathedral: Our Lady of Kazan Cathedral
- Language: Church Slavonic

Current leadership
- Governance: Eparchy
- Bishop: Cyril Nakonechny; 8 December 2020

Website
- www.tatmitropolia.ru

The Diocese of Kazan (Russian: Казанская епархия, Tatar: Казан епархиясе) is an eparchy of the Russian Orthodox Church on the administrative boundaries of Kazan, Naberezhnye Chelny in the Republic of Tatarstan.

== History ==
The Kazan diocese of the Russian Orthodox Church was established on April 3, 1555, three years after the conquest of the Khanate of Kazan. The first ruling bishop was the abbot of the Tver Selizharov monastery, Gury, who went to Kazan with archimandrites Barsanuphius and Herman of Kazan and Svyazhsk.

The most important events in the life of the Kazan diocese were the discovery of the Kazan Icon of the Mother of God in 1579, the participation of Kazan residents in the militia of Kuzma Minin and Dmitry Pozharsky with the blessing of Patriarch Hermogenes, the former Metropolitan of Kazan, and the all-Russian glorification of the Kazan Icon of the Mother of God.

During 1741, the missionaries managed to baptize 9,159 people throughout the province. Tatars and Bashkirs were only 143 among them. One way or another, missionary work in the Kazan region was rather sluggish, and the activities of the Kazan Theological Academy were reduced mainly to an in-depth study of the linguistic and cultural aspects of the existence of the peoples of the East.

At the beginning of the 19th century, the Kazan branch of the Bible Society was opened to translate the Holy Scriptures into local languages. In 1814, the New Testament was translated into Tatar, and in 1819, the first of the Old Testament books (the Book of Genesis). In 1847, a translation committee was opened at the Kazan Theological Academy, and in 1854 - three missionary departments. To support missionary education, the Orthodox Brotherhood of St. Gurias was established on October 4, 1867.

According to the data cited by Professor Nikolai Zagoskin, at the end of the 19th century in Kazan “there were 4 cathedrals, 28 parish churches, 2 churches assigned to monasteries, 3 military churches and 22 house churches, a total of 59 Orthodox churches” and 7 monasteries within the city, of which 4 have so far been transferred to dioceses, Fedorovsky was completely destroyed in the 20th century (in its place was the Kazan Scientific and Cultural Center); The Spaso-Preobrazhensky Monastery (the brethren's building, the 19th-century fence, the basement of the Transfiguration Cathedral have been preserved) and the Resurrection (also called New Jerusalem, the 18th-century temple has been preserved) are not active.

On June 11, 1993, the Yoshkar-Ola diocese was separated from the Kazan diocese within the Mari El Republic.

On June 6, 2012, independent Almetyevsk and Chistopol dioceses were separated with the inclusion of them and the Kazan diocese in the newly formed Tatarstan metropolitanate, after which the northeastern half of Tatarstan remained within the Kazan diocese.

== Former names ==
- Kazan and Sviyazhskaya (from February 3, 1555)
- Kazan and Astrakhan (from January 26, 1589)
- Kazan and Sviyazhskaya (since 1602)
- Kazan and Simbirsk (from October 16, 1799)
- Kazan and Sviyazhskaya (from February 10, 1832)
- Kazan and Chistopol (1949-1957)
- Kazan and Mari (1957-1993)
- Kazan and Tatarstan (July 1993 - June 2012)
- Kazan diocese (since June 2012)

== Bishops ==
- Gury (Rugotin) (February 3, 1555 - December 5, 1563)
- German (Sadyrev-Polev) (March 12, 1564 - November 6, 1567)
- Lawrence I (February 2, 1568 - July 13, 1574)
- Vassian (February 14 - May 21, 1575)
- Tikhon (Khvorostinin) (July 5, 1575 - June 14, 1576)
- Jeremiah (1576-1581)
- Cosmas (December 29, 1581 - 1583)
- Tikhon II (1583 - March 23, 1589)
- Hermogenes (May 13, 1589 - July 3, 1606)
- Ephraim (Khvostov) (August 1606 - December 26, 1613)
- Matthew (February 7, 1615 – January 13, 1646)
- Simeon (or Simon) Serb (February 7, 1646 - September 26, 1649)
- Cornelius I (January 13, 1650 - August 17, 1656)
- Lawrence (July 26, 1657 - November 11, 1672)
- Cornelius II (March 16, 1673 - August 6, 1674)
- Joasaph (September 6, 1674 - January 30, 1686)
- Adrian (21 March 1686 - 24 August 1690)
- Marcellus (8 September 1690 – 21 August 1698)
- Tikhon (Voinov) (March 25, 1699 - March 24, 1724)
- Sylvester (Kholmsky-Volynets) (August 1725 - December 30, 1731)
- Hilarion (Rogalevsky) (April 16, 1732 - March 25, 1735)
- Gabriel (Russian) (September 17, 1735 - March 9, 1738)
- Luka (Konashevich) (March 9, 1738 - October 9, 1755)
- Gabriel (Kremenetsky) (October 20, 1755 - July 25, 1762)
- Veniamin (Putsek-Grigorovich) (July 25, 1762 - March 17, 1782)
- Anthony (Gerasimov-Zybelin) (April 25, 1782 - March 5, 1785)
- Ambrose (Podobedov) (March 27, 1785 - October 16, 1799)
- Serapion (Alexandrovsky) (October 21, 1799 - December 11, 1803)
- Pavel (Zernov) (December 18, 1803 - January 14, 1815)
- Ambrose (Protasov) (February 7, 1816 - November 6, 1826)
- Jonah (Pavinsky) (November 6, 1826 - February 3, 1828)
- Filaret (Amphitheaters) (February 25, 1828 - September 19, 1836)
- Vladimir (Uzhinsky) (September 19, 1836 - March 1, 1848)
- Grigory (Postnikov) (March 1, 1848 - October 1, 1856)
- Afanasy (Sokolov) (November 3, 1856 - November 9, 1866)
- Anthony (Amphitheaters) (November 9, 1866 - November 8, 1879)
- Sergius (Lyapidevsky) (January 11, 1880 - August 21, 1882)
- Palladium (Raev-Pisarev) (August 21, 1882 - September 29, 1887)
- Pavel (Lebedev) (September 29, 1887 - April 23, 1892)
- Vladimir (Petrov) (May 7, 1892 - September 2, 1897)
- Arseny (Bryantsev) (October 4, 1897 - February 8, 1903)
- Dmitry (Kovalnitsky) (February 8, 1903 - March 26, 1905)
- Dmitry (Sambikin) (March 25, 1905 - March 17, 1908)
- Nikanor (Kamensky) (April 5, 1908 - November 27, 1910)
- Jacob (Pyatnitsky) (December 10, 1910 - April 8, 1920)
- Anatoly (Grisyuk) (September 1918 - April 1920, July 1920 - February 1921)
- Kirill (Smirnov) (April 8, 1920 - January 2, 1930)
- Joasaph (Udalov) (March 21, 1921 - January 4, 1922, August 21, 1922 - May 15, 1923)
- Mitrofan (Polikarpov) (beginning - November 1925) supreme, Bishop of Bugulma
- John (Shirokov) (1930) v/u, Bishop of Mari
- Afanasy (Malinin) (May 7, 1930 - March 23, 1933)
- Iriney (Shulmin) (March 23 - August 11, 1933) v/u, Bishop of Mamadysh
- Seraphim (Alexandrov) (August 11, 1933 - November 15, 1936)
- Venedikt (Plotnikov) (December 20, 1936 - February 1937)
- Nikon (Purlevsky) (June 5, 1937 - January 9, 1938)
- 1937-1942 - the diocese was widowed
- Andrey (Komarov) (August 26, 1942 - February 12, 1944)
- Ilariy (Ilyin) (May 26, 1944 - February 18, 1946) v/u, Bishop of Ulyanovsk
- Hermogenes (Kozhin) (February 18, 1946 - October 19, 1949)
- Justin (Maltsev) (October 20, 1949 - April 4, 1950)
- Sergius (Korolev) (September 26, 1950 - December 18, 1952)
- Job (Kresovich) (January 28, 1953 - March 1960)
- Mikhail (Voskresensky) (June 1960 - October 7, 1967)
- Sergius (Golubtsov) (October 7—23, 1967)
- Mikhail (Voskresensky) (October 23, 1967 - July 25, 1975) again
- Melchizedek (Lebedev) (July 25 - August 19, 1975) v/u
- Panteleimon (Mitryukovsky) (August 19, 1975 - November 30, 1988)
- Anastasy (Metkin) (December 11, 1988 - July 13, 2015)
- Feofan (Ashurkov) (July 13, 2015 - November 20, 2020) †
- John (Timofeev) (November 20, 2020 - December 8, 2020) supreme, Metropolitan of Yoshkar-Ola
- Cyril Nakonechny (from December 8, 2020)
