= Cyril Nakonechny =

Russian Orthodox Metropolitan of Volgograd Oblast

- Bishop of Rybinsk and Danilovsky
- Bishop Cyril in 2024
- Native name: Кирилл
- Church: Russian Orthodox Church
- Metropolis: Yekaterinburg Metropolitanate
- Diocese: Diocese of Yekaterinburg and Verkhoturye
- Appointed: 30 May 2019
- Successor: Incumbent

Orders
- Ordination: 6 May 1981 (deacon); 25 October 1980 (Tonsured); 15 March 1998 (Bishop)
- Rank: Bishop

Personal details
- Born: Mikhail Vasilyevich Nakonechny; 15 May 1961 (age 65) Verkhnechusovskie Gorodki, Chusovoy District, Soviet Union
- Denomination: Eastern Orthodox Church

Metropolitan Cyril (Nakonechny) (Russian: Кирилл (Наконечный), secular name Mikhail Vasilyevich Nakonechny, Russian: Михаил Васильевич Наконечный; born 15 May 1961) is a Metropolitan of the Russian Orthodox Church. Since 2020, he has been the Metropolitan of Kazan (Tatarstan).

== Early life ==
Nakonechny was born on 15 May 1961 in a working-class family in the urban-type settlement of Verkhnechusovskie Gorodki, Chusovoy District, Perm Region. He graduated from high school in 1978.

== Religious life ==
On 25 October 1980, Nakonechny was tonsured into monasticism with the name Cyril in honor of Cyril of Beloozero. The event occurred at the Dormition Cathedral in the city of Vladimir, and was presided by Archimandrite Alexy (Kutiepov).

On 26 October 1980, again at the Dormition Cathedral in Vladimir, he was ordained to the rank of hierodeacon by Archbishop Alexy of Vladimir and Serapion (Fadeev). Cyril would continue to serve at the Dormition Cathedral in Vladimir until his priestly ordination.

On 6 May 1981, he was ordained hieromonk by Archbishop Serapion (Fadeev), after which he was appointed cleric of the Holy Trinity Cathedral in the city of Alexandrov, Vladimir Oblast.

On 1 June 1982, he was appointed rector of the St. Nicholas Church in the city of Kirzhach and dean of churches in the Kirzhachsky District, where he served until 19 March 1984. On 28 March 1984, he was appointed rector of the Holy Dormition Cathedral in the city of Vladimir, secretary of the Archbishop of Vladimir and Suzdal and dean of churches in the Vladimir district. On 7 April 1984, Archbishop of Vladimir and Serapion (Fadeev) in the Assumption Cathedral in the city of Vladimir and was elevated to the rank of archimandrite.

In 1986 he graduated from the Moscow Theological Seminary in the correspondence education sector. On 10 June 1987, following Serapion (Fadeev) to the Moldavian diocese, he was appointed abbot of the Feodoro-Tiron Cathedral of Chișinău, secretary of the Metropolitan of Chișinău and Moldavia and dean of churches in the Chișinău district.

Having transferred to the clergy of the Tula diocese, where Metropolitan Serapion (Fadeev) was transferred, he was appointed on 7 July 1989, the secretary of the Metropolitan of Tula and Belev and dean of churches in the Tula city district. On 9 October 1995, he was dismissed from the post of secretary and dean and was appointed rector of St. Nicholas Church on Rzhavets in the city of Tula.

=== Bishop ===
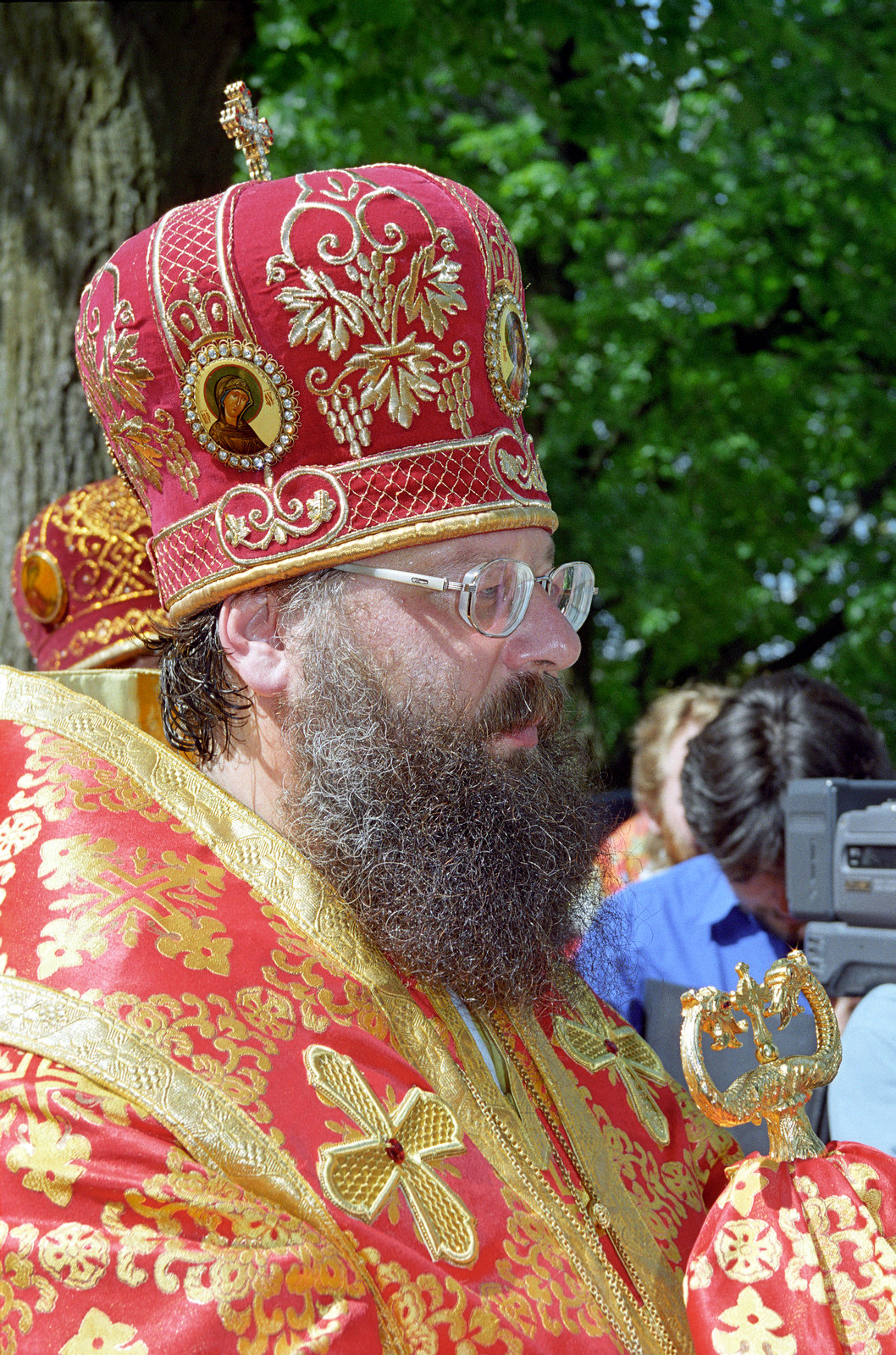
Cyril (Nakonechny) in 2004

On 26 February 1998, by decision of the Holy Synod, on the recommendation of Metropolitan Serapion, he was elected Bishop of the Mother of God, vicar of the Tula diocese, which was headed by Metropolitan Serapion.

On 15 March 1998, at the Epiphany Cathedral in Moscow, he was ordained Bishop of the Mother of God, vicar of the Tula diocese. Ordination made: Moscow and All Rus Alexis II, Metropolitan of Krutitskii and Kolomensky Juvenal (Poyarkov), Archbishop of Solnechnogorskiy Sergy (Fomin), Archbishop of Alma-Ata and Semipalatinsk Alexy (Kutiepov), Archbishop Tver and Kashinsky Victor (Oleynik), Archbishop Istrinskiy Arsenius (Yepifanov), Archbishop of Vladimir and Suzdal Eulogius (Smirnov), Bishops of Bronnitsky Tikhon (Yemelyanov), Bishop of Vologda and Veliky Ustyug Maximilian (Lazarenko), Bishop of Orekhovo-Zuevsky Alexy (Frolov), Bishop of Krasnogorsk Sabbas (Volkov).

From 15 March 1999 to 15 March 2000 Cyril served as the abbot-rector of the All Saints Cathedral in Tula.

On 19 July 2000, by the decision of the Holy Synod, he was appointed to be the bishop of Tula and Belevsky. On 6 October 2001, the Holy Synod transformed the Tula Theological School into a formal Orthodox seminary, and appointed Bishop Cyril as its rector.

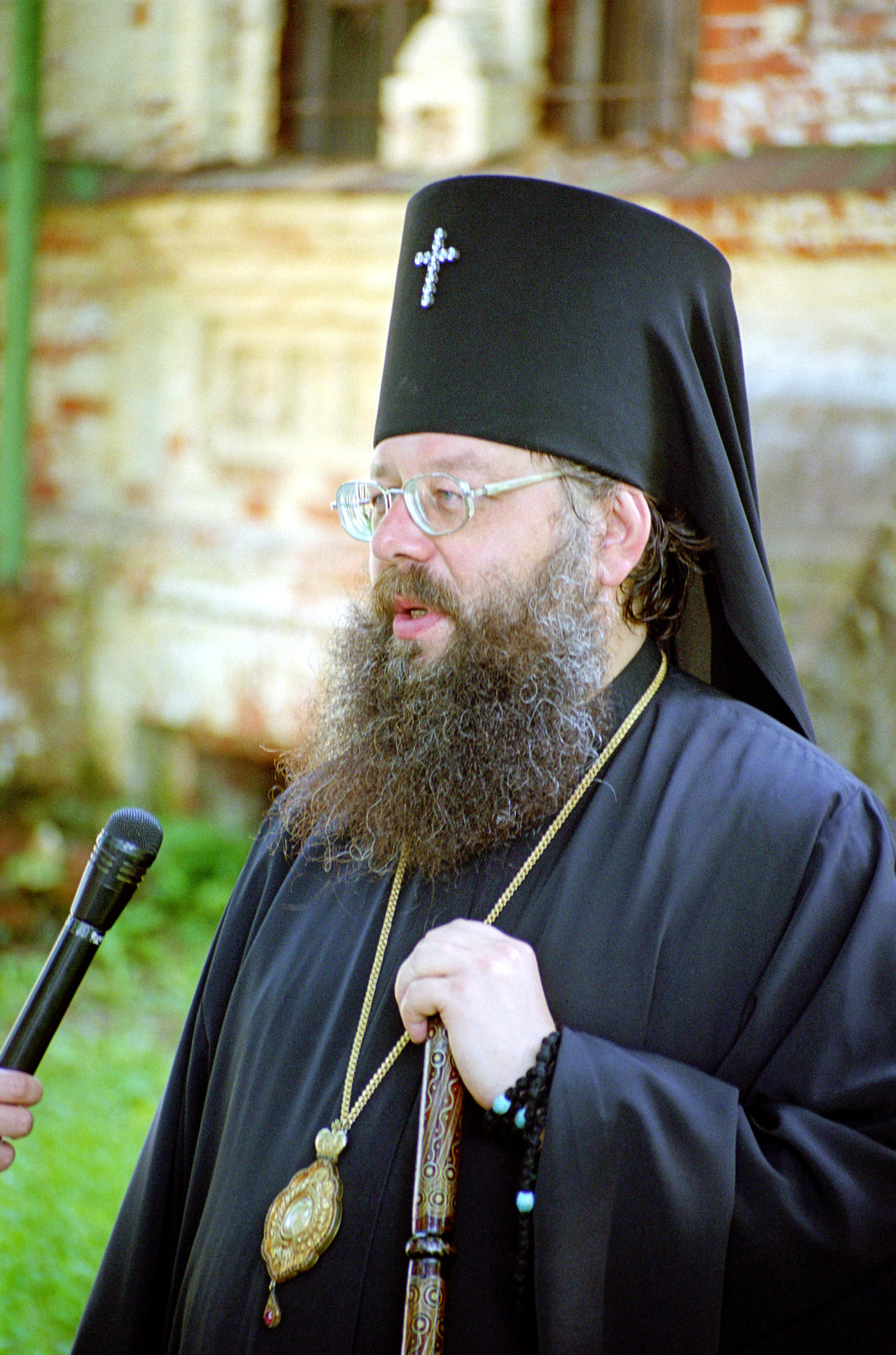
Cyril in 2004

On 7 October 2002, by the decision of the Holy Synod, he was appointed to be the bishop of Yaroslavl and Rostov. As a result of his new appointment, the Holy Synod dismissed him from the post of rector of the Tula Theological Seminary on 26 December 2002.

On 27 July 2011, by the decision of the Holy Synod, he was appointed Archbishop of Yekaterinburg and Verkhotursk. On 5 October 2011 he was appointed rector of the Yekaterinburg Theological Seminary. On 6 October 2011, he was appointed head of the newly formed Yekaterinburg Metropolitanate. On October 8, at the Dormition Cathedral of the Trinity Lavra of St. Sergius was elevated to the rank of Metropolitan by Patriarch Kirill of Moscow and All Russia.

From 28 December 2011 to 18 March 2012 and from 29 May 2013 to 25 January 2014, he was temporarily in charge the Kamensk diocese.

In March 2015 there was controversy after Cyril (Nakonechny) decided to remove a priest by the name of Vladimir Zaitsev from ministry. Zaitsev, an Orthodox priest in Yekaterinburg had been displaying the Flag of Novorossiya at his church as well as actively fundraising and recruiting for the separatist Luhansk People's Republic. After meeting with the diocesan council, Cyril decided to remove Zaitsev from public ministry and sent him to the monastery at Ganina Yama. Zaitsev's removal caused immediate backlash, with many from his parish and the diocese angrily writing to Cyril demanding that the priest be reinstated. In early April 2015 Zaitsev was reinstalled as pastor of his church, having stayed at Ganina Yama for less than two weeks.

On 22 October 2015, he was relieved of his duties as the rector of the Yekaterinburg Theological Seminary.

On 8 December 2020, by the decision of the Holy Synod, he was appointed Metropolitan of Kazan and Tatarstan, the head of the Tatarstan Metropolitanate with his release from the management of the Yekaterinburg diocese. On 13 April 2021, the Holy Synod approved Metropolitan Cyril as the Archimandrite of the Kazan Mother of God Monastery.
