= Diocese of Ungheni and Nisporeni =

Moldovan Orthodox diocese

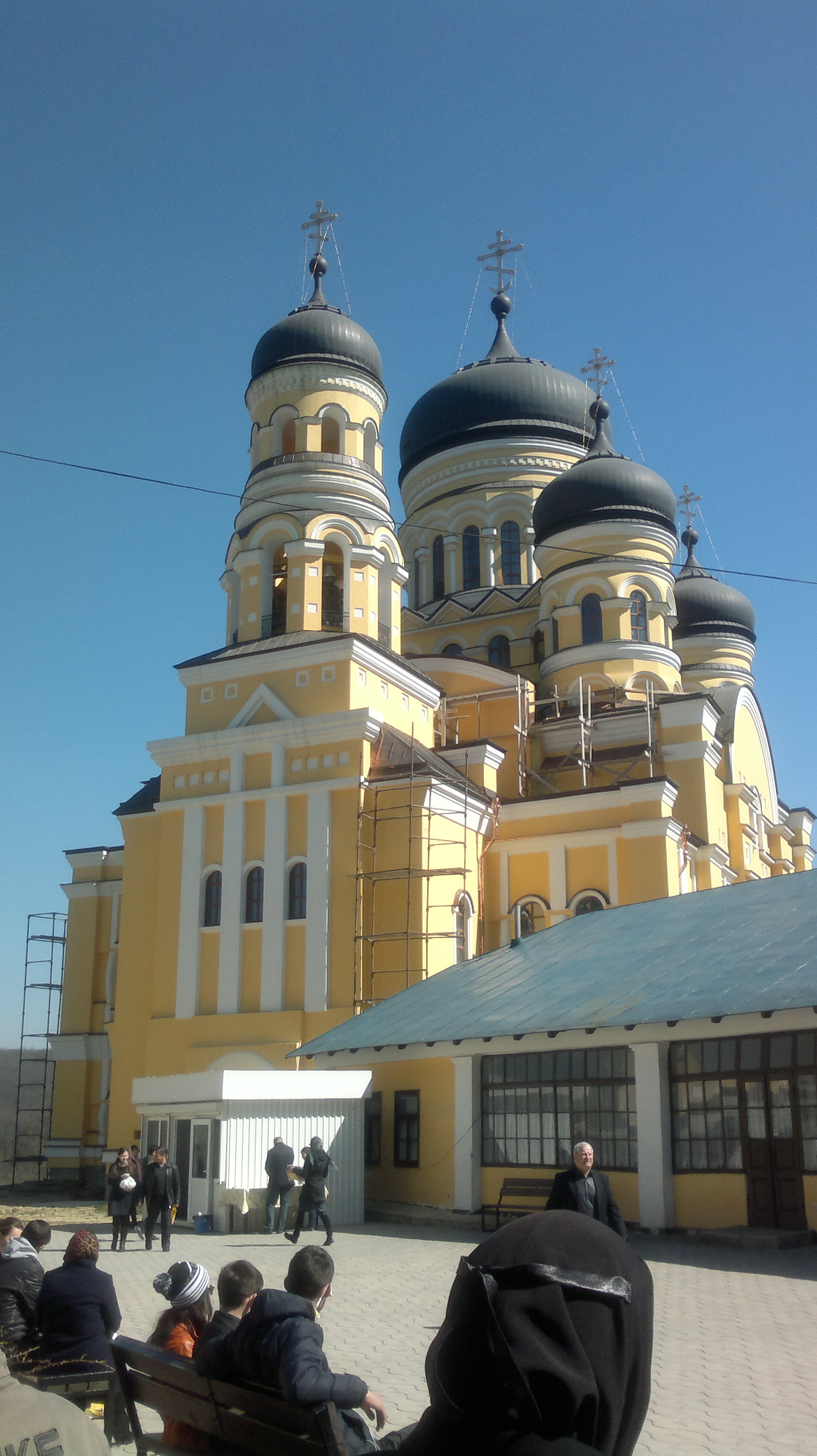
Mănăstirea Hâncu (2)

The Diocese of Ungheni and Nisporeni (Russian: Унгенская и Ниспоренская епархия, Romanian: Eparhia de Ungheni și Nisporeni) is an eparchy or diocese of the Metropolis of Chișinău and All Moldova under the Moscow Patriarchate with its seat in the city of Ungheni, Moldova.

== History ==
The Eparchy of Ungheni and Nisporeni was established on October 6, 2006, by the Holy Synod of the Russian Orthodox Church out of the territory of the Eparchy of Chișinău.

As of 2010 the Eparchy consisted of 145 parishes, 9 monasteries, and 1 skete served by 147 full-time priests and 5 deacons. Its current bishop is Petru (Musteață).
