= Peter Musteață =

Moldovan Orthodox bishop

Bishop Petru
- Born: October 29, 1967 (age 57); Lupa-Recea, Moldovan SSR
- Education: Odesa Theological Seminary
- Church: Moldovan Orthodox Church
- Ordained: 1992 (monk/deacon/priest), 2005 (bishop)
- Title: Bishop of Ungheni and Nisporeni

Bishop Peter or Petru (secular name Valeriu Musteață; born October 29, 1967), is a bishop of the Moldovan Orthodox Church under the Moscow Patriarchate. He serves as Bishop of Ungheni and Nisporeni, a diocese of the Russian Orthodox Church in Moldova.

== Life ==
Born in 1967, Valeriu completed secondary school in 1985 and entered the Soviet Army, serving from 1986 until 1988. Following his discharge from 1988 until 1992 Valeriu studied at the Odesa Theological Seminary in Odesa, Ukraine. In 1992 Valeriu was tonsured a monk with the name Peter, and later on in 1992 Metropolitan Vladimir (Cantarean) of Chisinau ordained him first a deacon (in July) and then a priest (in August).

In September 1992 Hieromonk Peter was appointed as confessor of the Hâncu Monastery, in 1993 becoming its abbot. In November 1995 Igumen Peter was elevated to the rank of archimandrite.

On October 6, 2005, Archimandrite Petru was elected Bishop of Nisporeni by the Holy Synod of the Russian Orthodox Church and appointed as a vicar of the Eparchy of Chișinău. On November 13, 2005, Fr. Peter was consecrated to the episcopacy in Chisinau's Holy Nativity Cathedral.

On October 6, 2006, the Russian Orthodox Church established the Ungheni and Nisporeni Eparchy and elected Bishop Petru as diocesan Bishop of Ungheni and Nisporeni. Due to disturbances within the eparchy the Russian Orthodox Holy Synod decided in March 2007 to temporarily relieve Bishop Petru of his responsibilities, limiting him to the administration of the Hâncu Monastery and later designating him as a vicar of the Chisinau Eparchy as Bishop of Hâncu.

In December 2010 the Holy Synod restored Bishop Petru to the leadership of the Ungheni and Nisporeni Eparchy.
