= Church of the Intercession, Yasenevo =

Church in Moscow, Russia

Coordinates: 55°36′55″N 37°32′23″E

Church of the Intercession of the Holy Virgin
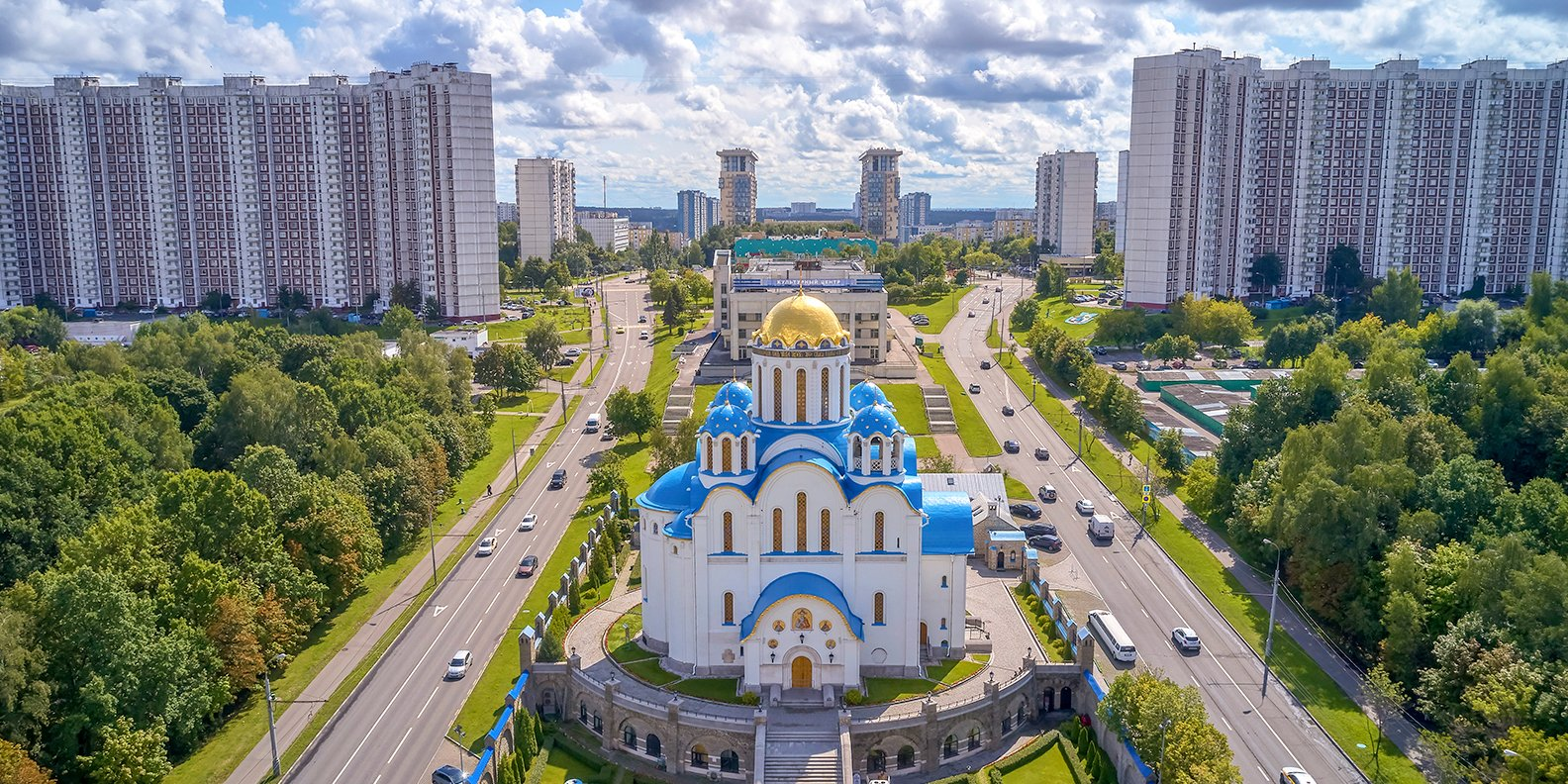

Religion
- Affiliation: Russian Orthodox

Location
- Location: Yasenevo, Moscow Oblast Russia
- Interactive map of Church of the Intercession of the Holy Virgin

Architecture
- Architects: V.I. Kozlov, L.A. Petrova
- Established: 2008
- Completed: 2015

Church of the Intercession of the Holy Virgin (Russian: Храм Покрова Пресвятой Богородицы в Ясеневе) is located in the Moscow district of Yasenevo District in the South-Western Administrative Okrug of Moscow Oblast and is part of the Russian Orthodox eparchy of Moscow. Designed by V.I. Kozlov and L.A. Petrova, the church was established in 2008 when construction began and was completed in 2015.

== Construction ==
Development for the church began in 2007, as part of a project by the Russian Orthodox Church to build 200 new worship centers in the Moscow region in the coming decade. The Russian Orthodox hierarchy claimed that in Yasenevo there were 180,000 practicing Orthodox Christians yet only 4 churches in the immediate area. The church was designed by V. I. Kozlov and L.a. Petrova, and the church was officially established in 2008. Construction continued for the next seven years. The construction started even though not all the cost to build the church had yet been covered by sponsors and donors. In 2014, despite not being yet completed, the church won the competition called "The Best Implemented Project in the Field of Investments and Construction", in the nomination "Religious Buildings" for churches in the Moscow Oblast. The design of the church combined old Russian and Byzantine traditional architecture of the 11th-12th centuries. The total area of 1425 square meters.

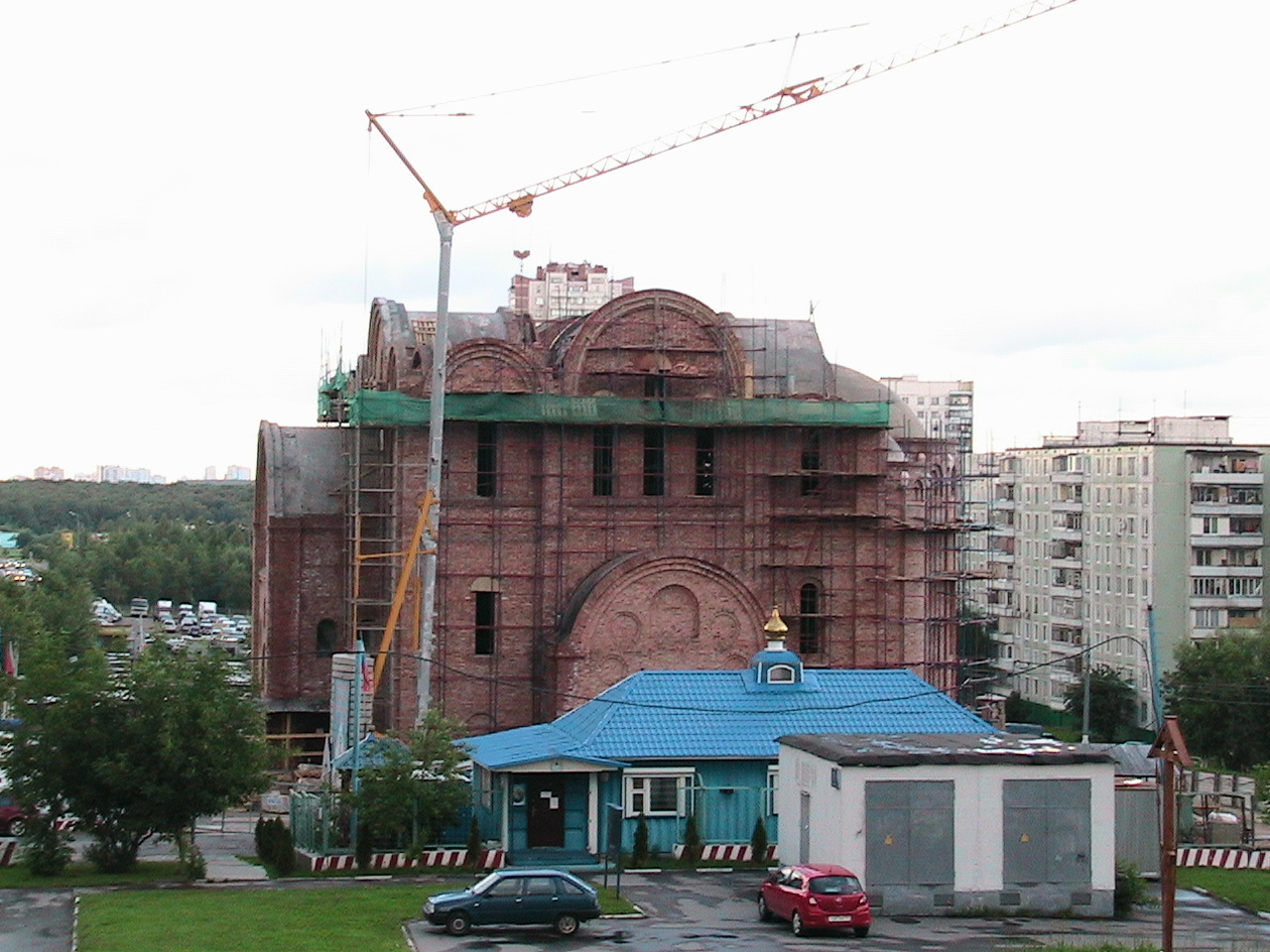
The church under construction in June 2010

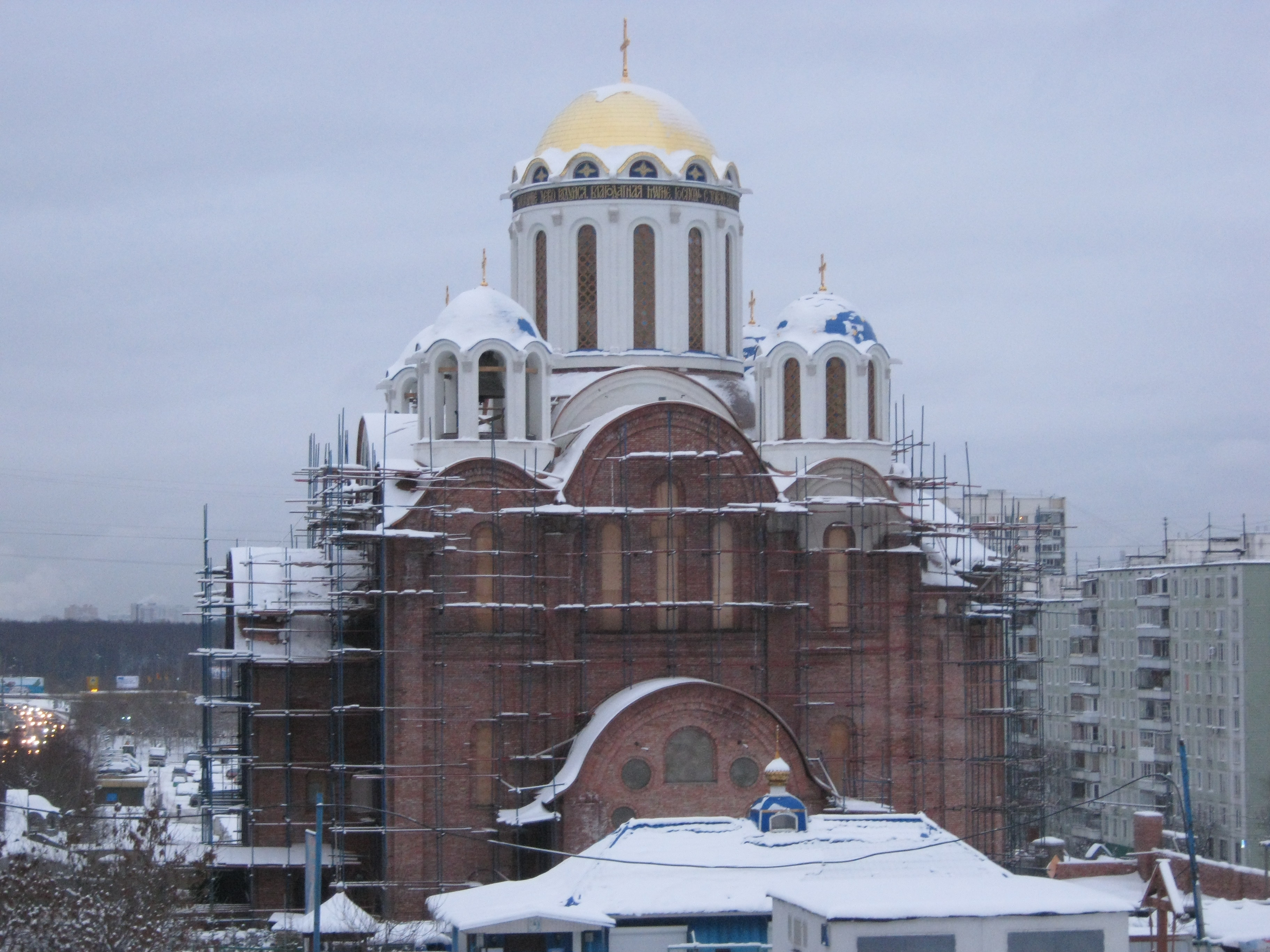
The church under construction in January 2012

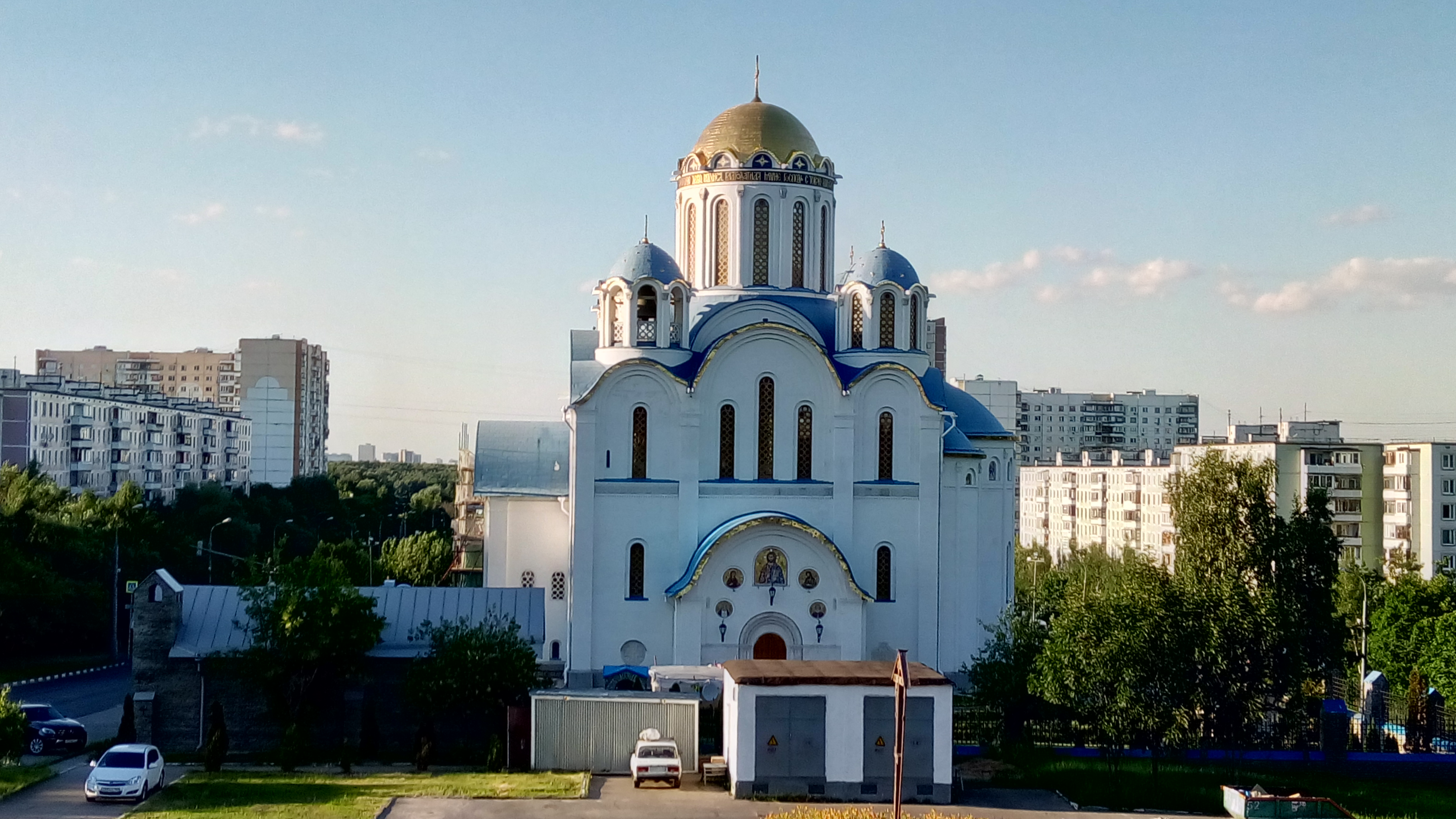
The church after being completed in 2015

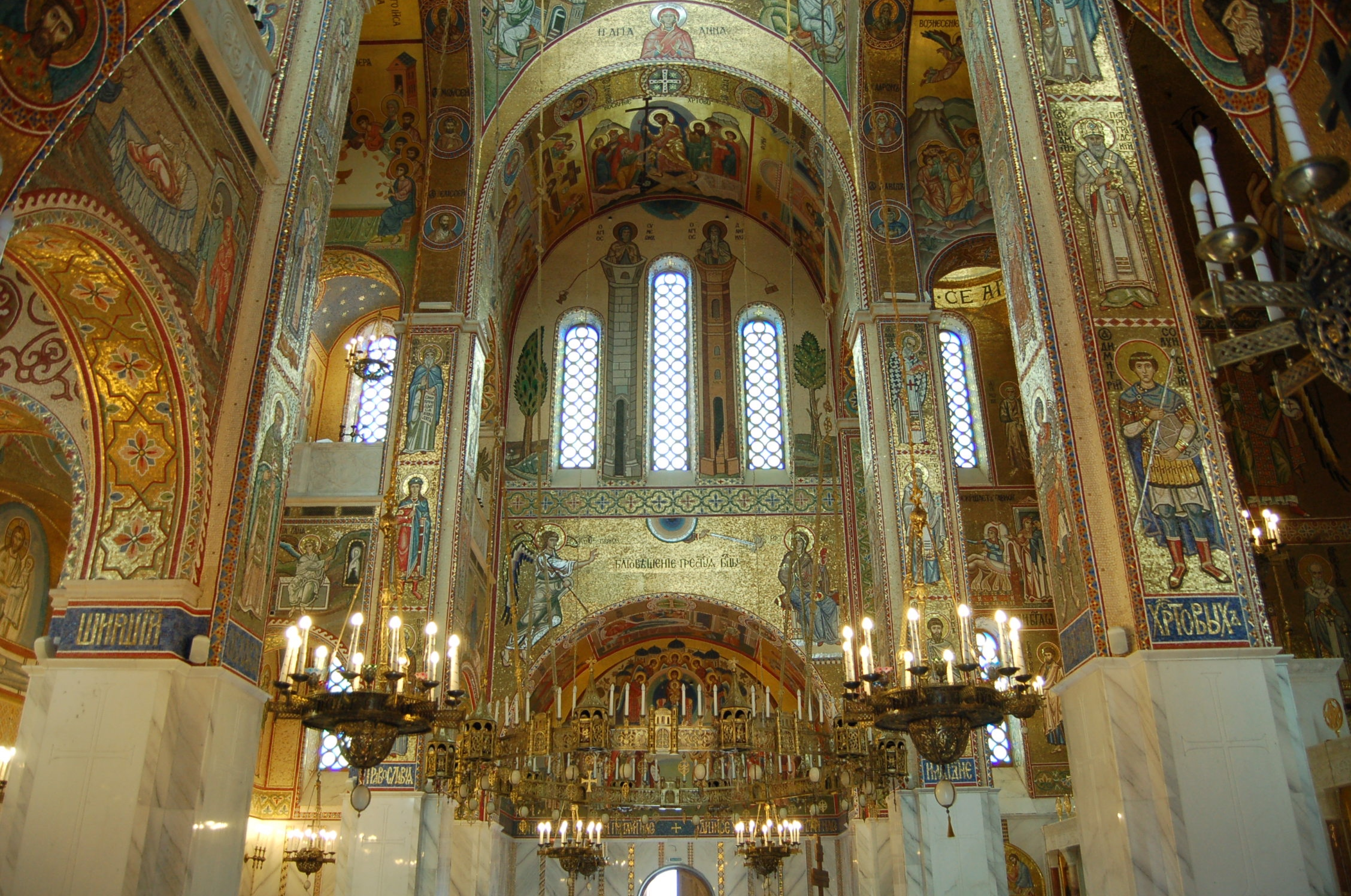
Interior of the church photographed in 2015 while still under construction

== Today ==
The rector of the church is Archimandrite Melchizedek (Artyukhin).

On 27 December 2015 Theodore (Kazanov) was consecrated bishop of Pereslavl and Uglich by Patriarch Kirill of Moscow at the Church of the Intercession.

The church is a popular destination for both tourist and Orthodox worshipers, the Christmas celebration in 2019 brought a wide array of Orthodox Christians from Moscow and beyond.

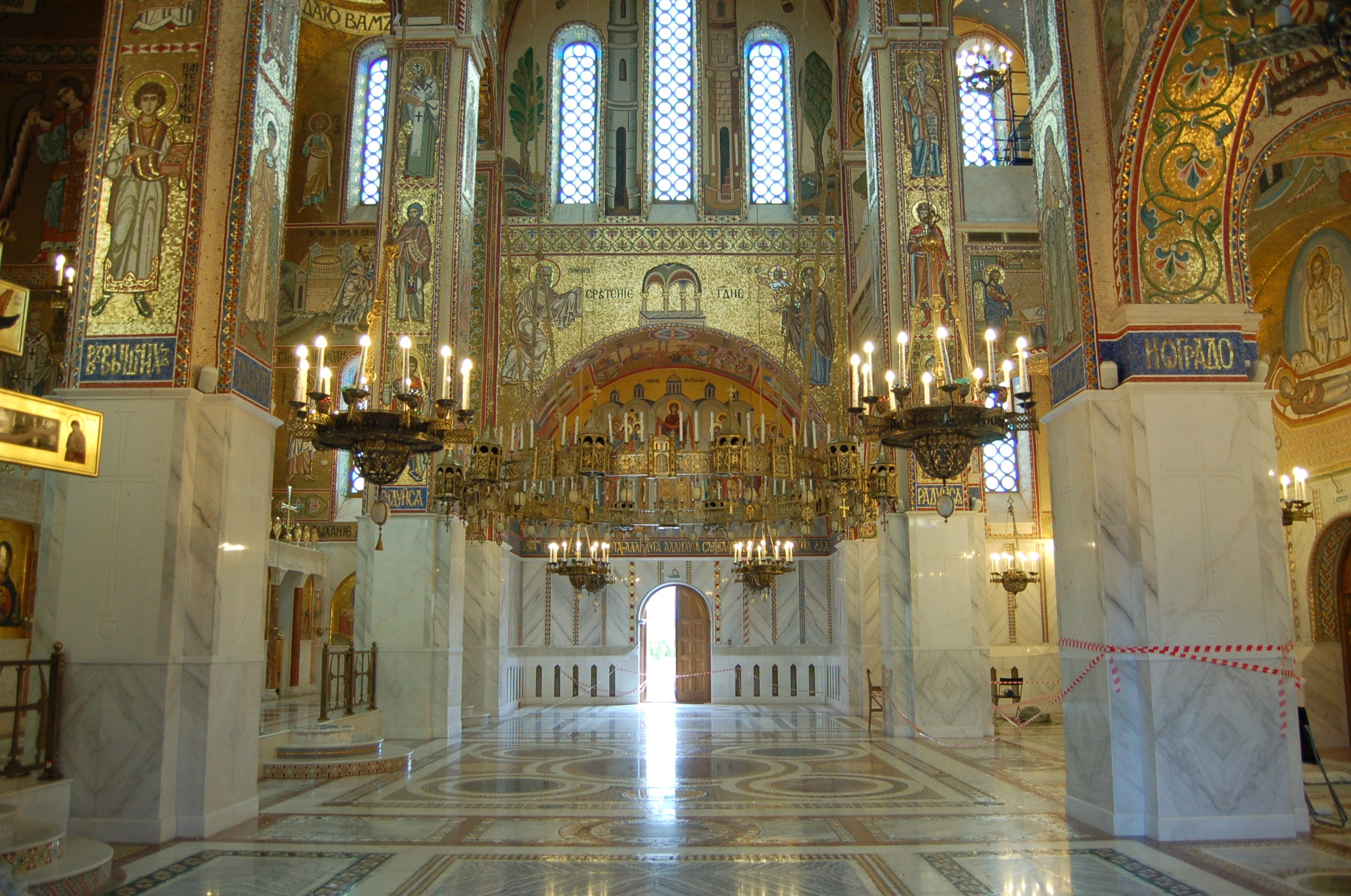
Interior facing the entrance

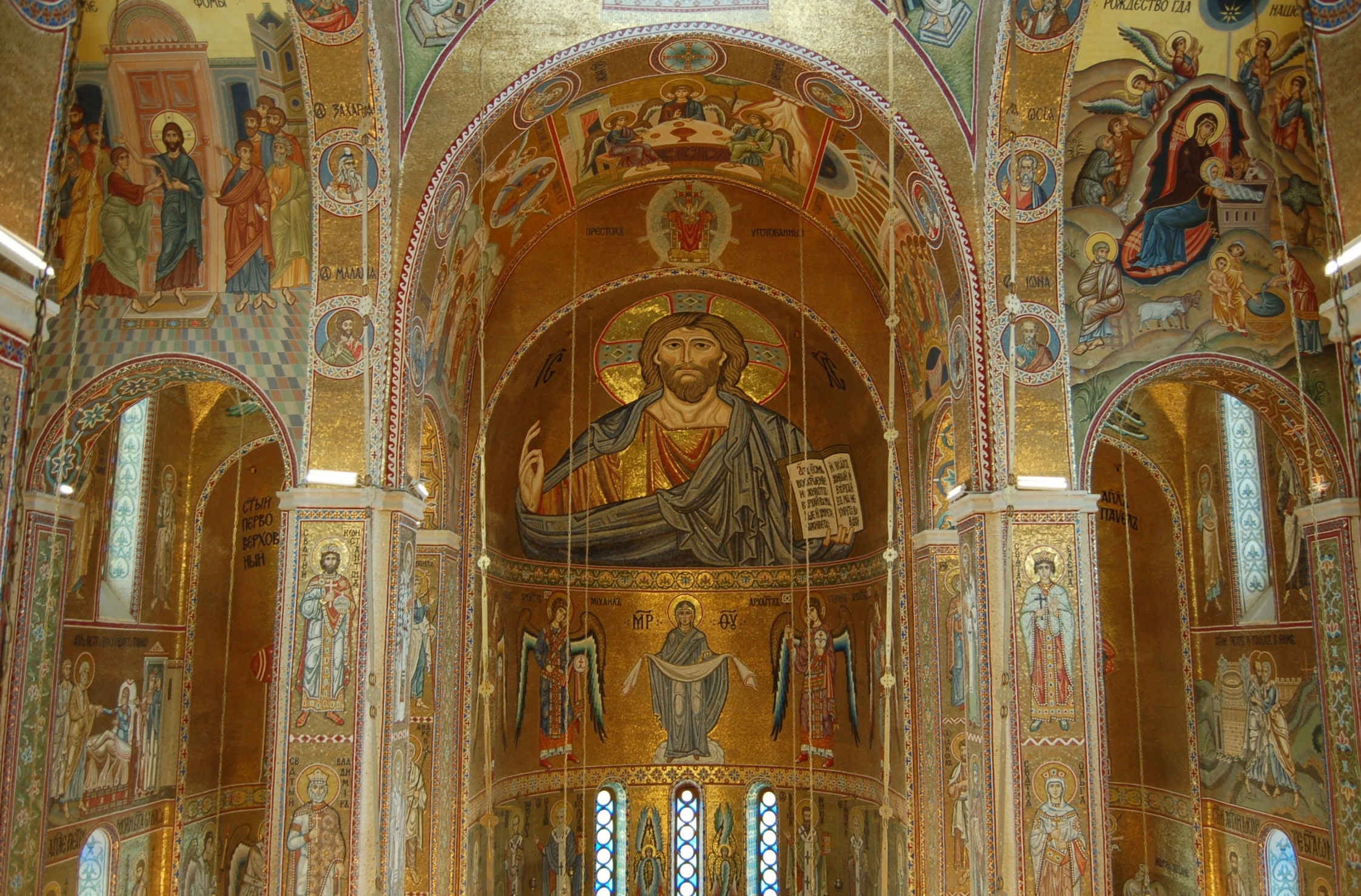
The Christ Pantocrator on the ceiling

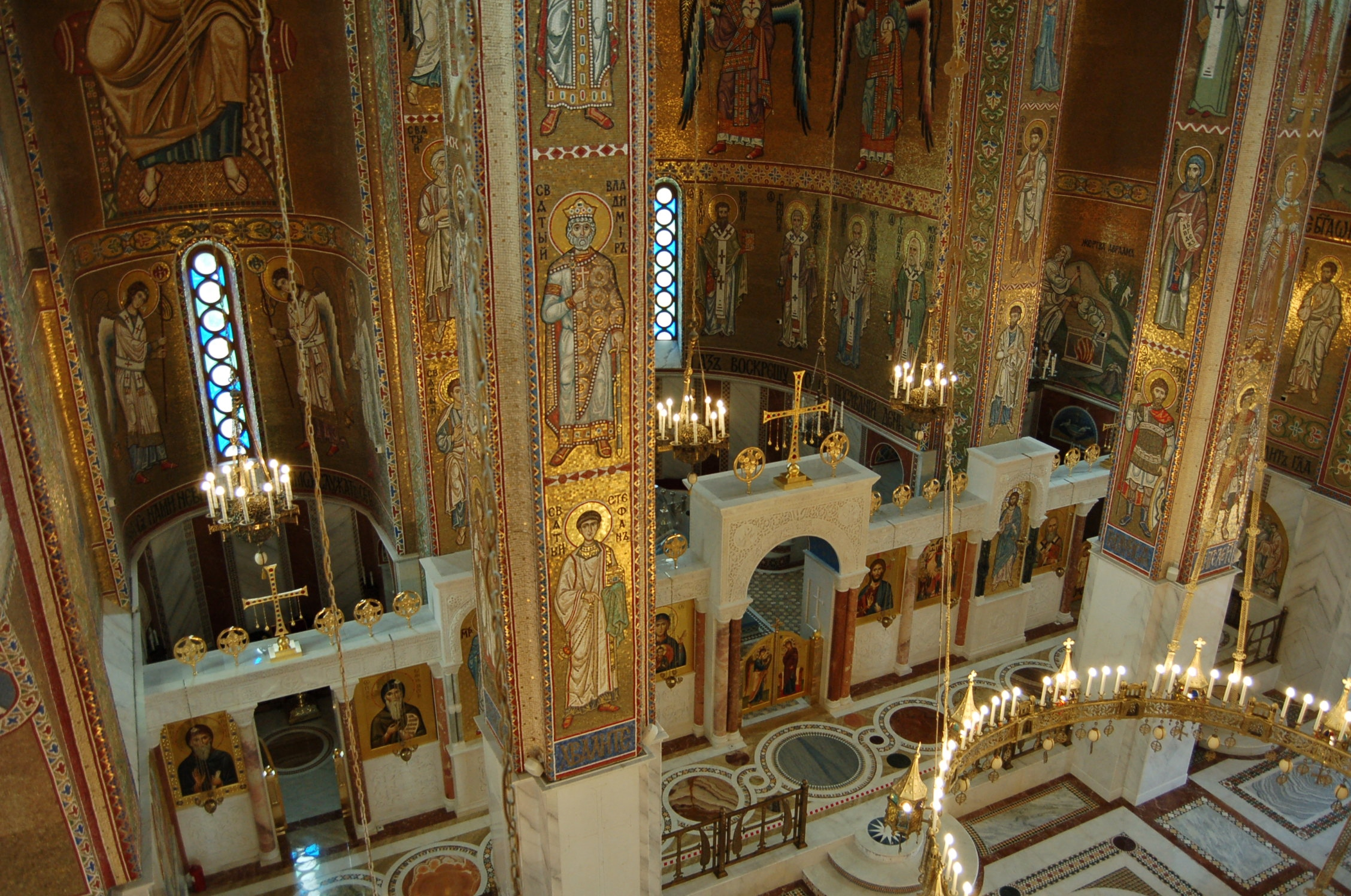
The Iconostasis

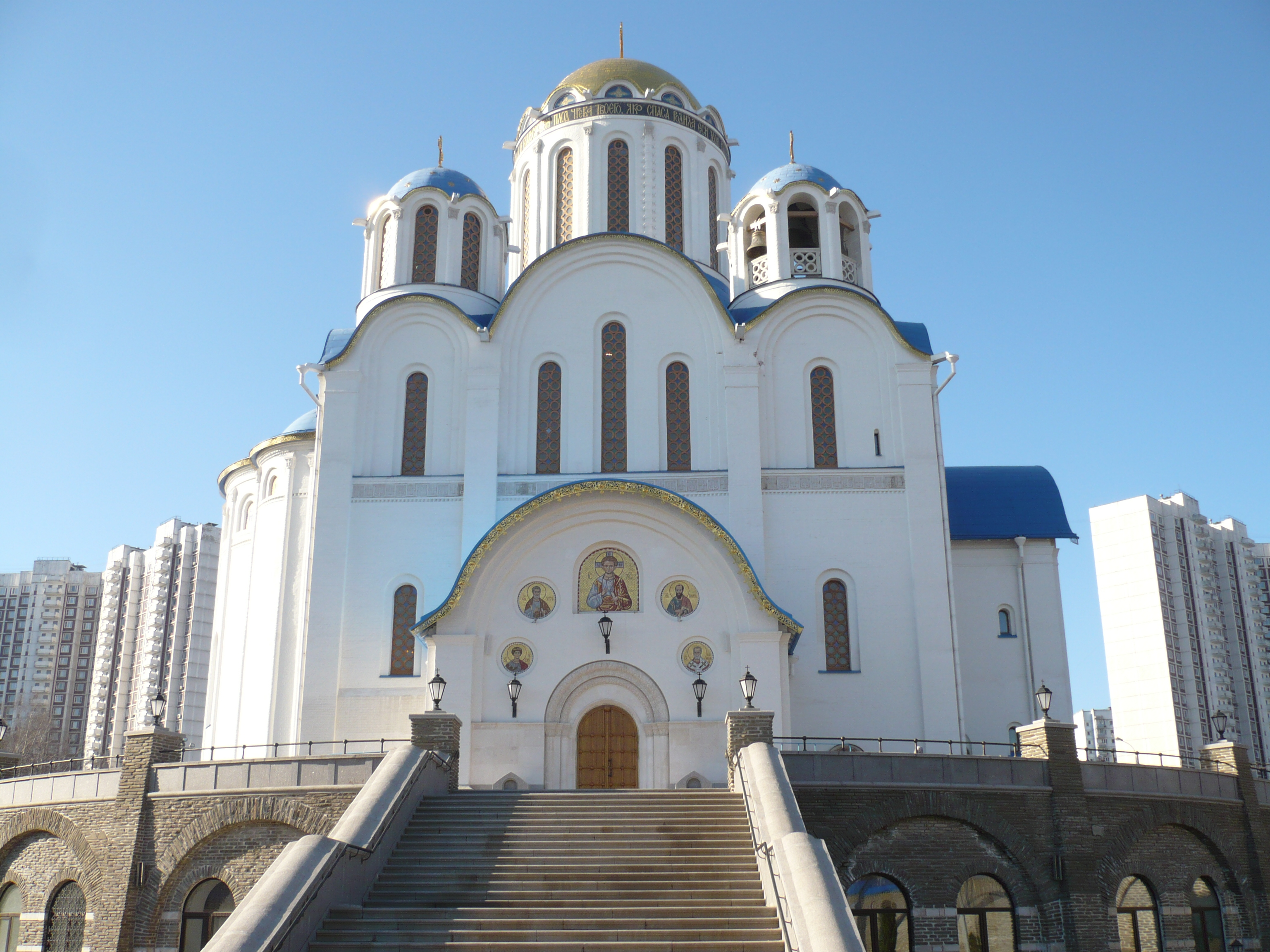
The church at its opening in April 2015
