= Nedoboivtsi =

Commune in Chernivtsi Oblast, Ukraine

Coordinates: 48.4361°N 26.3608°E

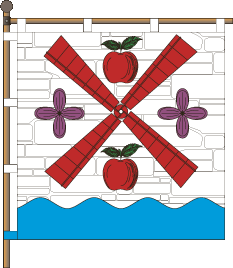
Flag of the Nedoboivska

Nedoboivtsi (Ukrainian: Недобоївці; Romanian: Nedăbăuți) is a village in Dniester Raion, Chernivtsi Oblast, Ukraine. It hosts the administration of Nedoboivtsi rural hromada, one of the hromadas of Ukraine.

Until 18 July 2020, Nedoboivtsi belonged to Khotyn Raion. The raion was abolished in July 2020 as part of the administrative reform of Ukraine, which reduced the number of raions of Chernivtsi Oblast to three. The area of Khotyn Raion was merged into Dniester Raion.
