= Bochkivtsi =

Village in Chernivtsi Oblast, Ukraine

Coordinates: 48.4314°N 26.165°E

Bochkivtsi (Ukrainian: Бочківці; Romanian: Bocicăuți) is a village in Chernivtsi Raion, Chernivtsi Oblast, Ukraine. It belongs to Toporyvtsi rural hromada, one of the hromadas of Ukraine.

Until 18 July 2020, Bochkivtsi belonged to Khotyn Raion. The raion was abolished in July 2020 as part of the administrative reform of Ukraine, which reduced the number of raions of Chernivtsi Oblast to three. The area of Khotyn Raion was merged into Dniester Raion. However, Bochkivtsi, together with Hrozyntsi and Kolinkivtsi, belonged to Toporyvtsi rural hromada, based in Novoselytsia Raion. After the reform, these villages were transferred to Chernivtsi Raion.
