= Pîrlița, Fălești =

Pîrlița
- Commune and village
- Flag Coat of arms

- Location in Moldova
- Coordinates: 47°44′N 27°48′E
- Country: Moldova
- District: Fălești District

Population (2014 census)
  - Total: 3,351
- Time zone: UTC+2 (EET)
  - Summer (DST): UTC+3 (EEST)

Pîrlița is a village in Fălești District, Moldova.

== Notable people ==
- Ignație Budișteanu
