= Aurel Morariu =

Romanian lawyer and politician

Aurel Morariu (January 15 [O.S. January 3] 1886 – November 28, 1945) was a Romanian lawyer and politician.

== Biography ==
Born in Toporăuți, a village outside Cernăuți, the capital of the Duchy of Bukovina, his parents were the Orthodox priest Constantin and his wife Elena (née Popescu). From 1896 to 1904, he studied at the Greek-Orthodox Gymnasium in Suceava. He graduated from the law faculty of Czernowitz University in 1909, and obtained a doctorate of law from Charles University in Prague in 1914. Active on behalf of Bukovina's Romanians, he fled to the Romanian Old Kingdom after the outbreak of World War I. In 1915, he published the study Bucovina (1774-1914) in Bucharest. As a Bukovina refugee, he enlisted in the Romanian Land Forces, seeing frontline action during the Battle of Mărășești as a second lieutenant in the reserves. In late 1918, he was part of the Romanian National Committee and took part in the congress that voted for the union of Bukovina with Romania.

Within Greater Romania, he initially belonged to the Democratic Union Party and then to the National Liberal Party. He was elected to the Assembly of Deputies in 1919, 1920, 1922, 1927, and 1937. As a lawyer in Cernăuți, he specialized in economic and cooperative cases. He headed the Society of Romanian Craftsmen, Sellers and Industrialists of Upper Moldavia. He was active in the history institute created in November 1942 at the Cernăuți theology faculty. He was awarded the Order of the Star and of the Crown. He died in Craiova.
