= Tikhon Stepanov =

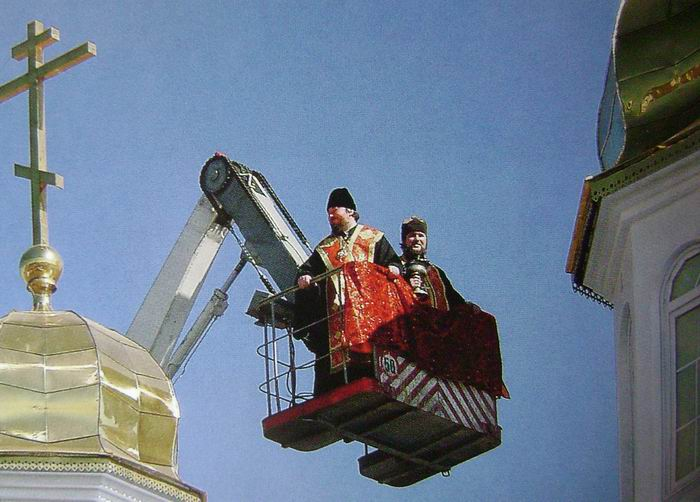
Bishop Tikhon of Archangelsk and Kolmogorsk blessing a cupola on the Church of the Vladimir Icon of the Mother of God

Bishop Tikhon (secular name Nikolay Vladimirovich Stepanov, Николай Владимирович Степанов; 2 March 1963, Kostroma – 20 October 2010, Arkhangelsk, Russia) was the Russian Orthodox bishop of Arkhangelsk and Kholmogory.
