= Herman of Kazan and Svyazhsk =

Herman
- Archbishop of Kazan and Svyazhsk
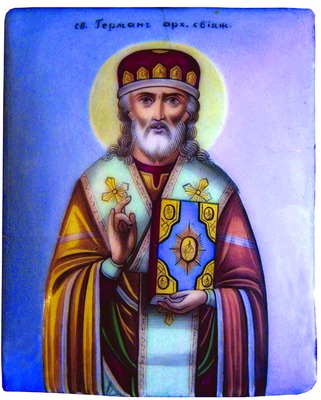
- Church: Russian Orthodox Church
- Installed: 1564
- Term ended: 1567

Personal details
- Born: 1505
- Died: 6 November 1567 (aged 61–62)

Archbishop Herman (Russian: Герман), born Grigory Fyodorovich Sadyrev-Polev (Russian: Григорий Фёдорович Садырев-Полев; died 6 November 1567), was the archbishop of Kazan from 1564 to 1567. He was also a candidate for the position of metropolitan of Moscow.

He died in Moscow and was buried in the Church of Saint Nicholas the Hospitable.

== Biography ==
Herman took monastic vows in Joseph-Volokolamsk Monastery. Here he served under Hegumen Guriy, who would become the first archbishop of Kazan, and was engaged in copying books. Upon organizing his congregation in Kazan, Guriy called for Herman and appointed him as the head of the Bogoroditsky Monastery in Sviyazhsk. The Russian Orthodox Church attached great importance to this monastery in terms of spreading Christianity among the non-Russians in the Kazan region.

Upon Guriy's death in 1564, Herman was elected his successor. At the insistence of Ivan the Terrible and against Herman's will, he was appointed Metropolitan of Moscow in 1566. When the Tsar seized land from the aristocrats and imposed repression in a policy called the oprichnina, Herman demanded the Tsar to abolish it. Herman was banished from Moscow in disgrace for this opposition.

Herman died in Moscow in 1567. His relics were then transported to Sviyazhsk, where they are resting to this day in Bogoroditsky Monastery The Russian Church celebrates his memory on 6 November and 23 July, the day his relics were transferred from Moscow to Sviyazhsk.

Eastern Orthodox Church titles
| Preceded by Gury | Archbishop of Kazan and Svyazhsk; 1566–1567 | Succeeded by Lavrenty |
