= Vladimir Cantarean =

Metropolitan of Chișinău and All Moldova

Vladimir OR
- Metropolitan of Chișinău and All Moldova
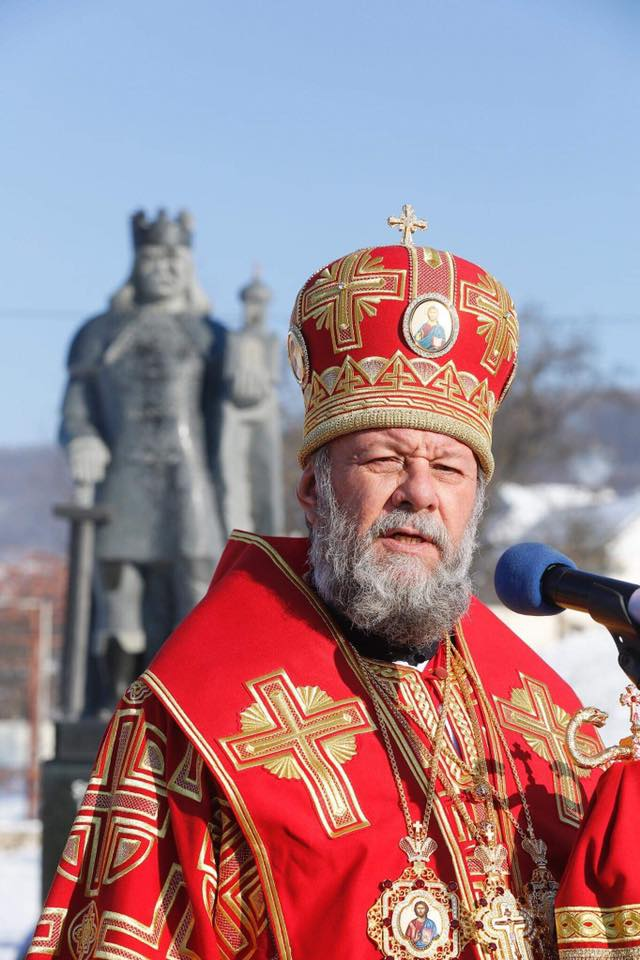
- Vladimir in 2018
- Church: Moldovan Orthodox Church
- See: Chișinău
- Installed: 21 December 1992

Orders
- Ordination: 22 May 1974
- Consecration: 21 July 1989

Personal details
- Born: Nicolae Cantarean; 18 August 1952 (age 74) Kolinkivtsi, Ukrainian SSR, Soviet Union
- Denomination: Eastern Orthodox Church
- Education: Moscow Theological Academy

Vladimir (born Nicolae Cantarean, 18 August 1952) is a bishop of the Moldovan Orthodox Church under the Moscow Patriarchate. He serves as Metropolitan of Chișinău and All Moldova and thus as first hierarch of the Church of Moldova and as a permanent member of the Holy Synod of the Russian Orthodox Church.

== Life ==
Nicolae Cantarean was born in Kolinkivtsi (Romanian: Colencăuți), Khotyn Raion, in the west of the Ukrainian SSR, part of the historical region of Bessarabia, nowadays bordering northern Moldova. Born into a working-class family, in 1969 Nicolae graduated from secondary school and, in 1970, from vocational school. He served in the Soviet Army from 1970 until 1973, after which he began working in the administration of the Eparchy of Smolensk.

In a 2023 interview for Deutsche Welle, Metropolitan Vladimir declared: "my father was from Chernivtsi, Hertsa raion, the village of Khriatska - a Romanian village. My father was a Romanian until his last breath. My mother was from Kolinkivtsi. All of my grandparents were Ukrainians [...] I am a citizen of Ukraine. My childhood home is in Ukraine".

On May 22, 1974, Nicolae was ordained as a celibate deacon, and then on May 22, 1976, as a celibate priest in Smolensk's Cathedral of the Dormition. In 1981 Hieromonk Nicolae graduated from the Moscow Theological Seminary and was appointed to serve at the Cathedral of St. Nicholas in Chernivtsi the same year. From 1983 Fr. Nicolae also served as secretary of the administration of the Eparchy of Chernivtsi and Bukovina.

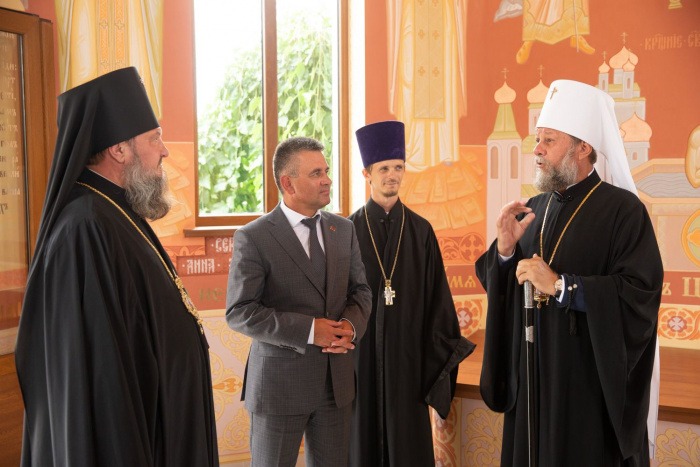
Bishop Savva (Volkov), Metropolitan Vladimir (Cantarean) and Vadim Krasnoselski in Bender, 2019.

On November 29, 1987, Fr. Nicolae was tonsured a monk with the name of Vladimir, and in 1988 was elevated to the rank of archimandrite. In 1989 Archimandrite Vladimir graduated from the Moscow Theological Academy, and on July 21, 1989, was consecrated Bishop of Chişinău and Moldova at Holy Theophany Cathedral in Moscow. On April 4, 1990, Bishop Vladimir was elevated to the rank of archbishop, and on December 21, 1992, to the rank of metropolitan as head of the newly autonomous Moldovan Orthodox Church. Along with Vincent (Morar), he was a strong opponent of the reactivation of the Metropolis of Bessarabia (under the leadership of Petru (Păduraru)) within the Romanian Orthodox Church, even persecuting some of its believers.

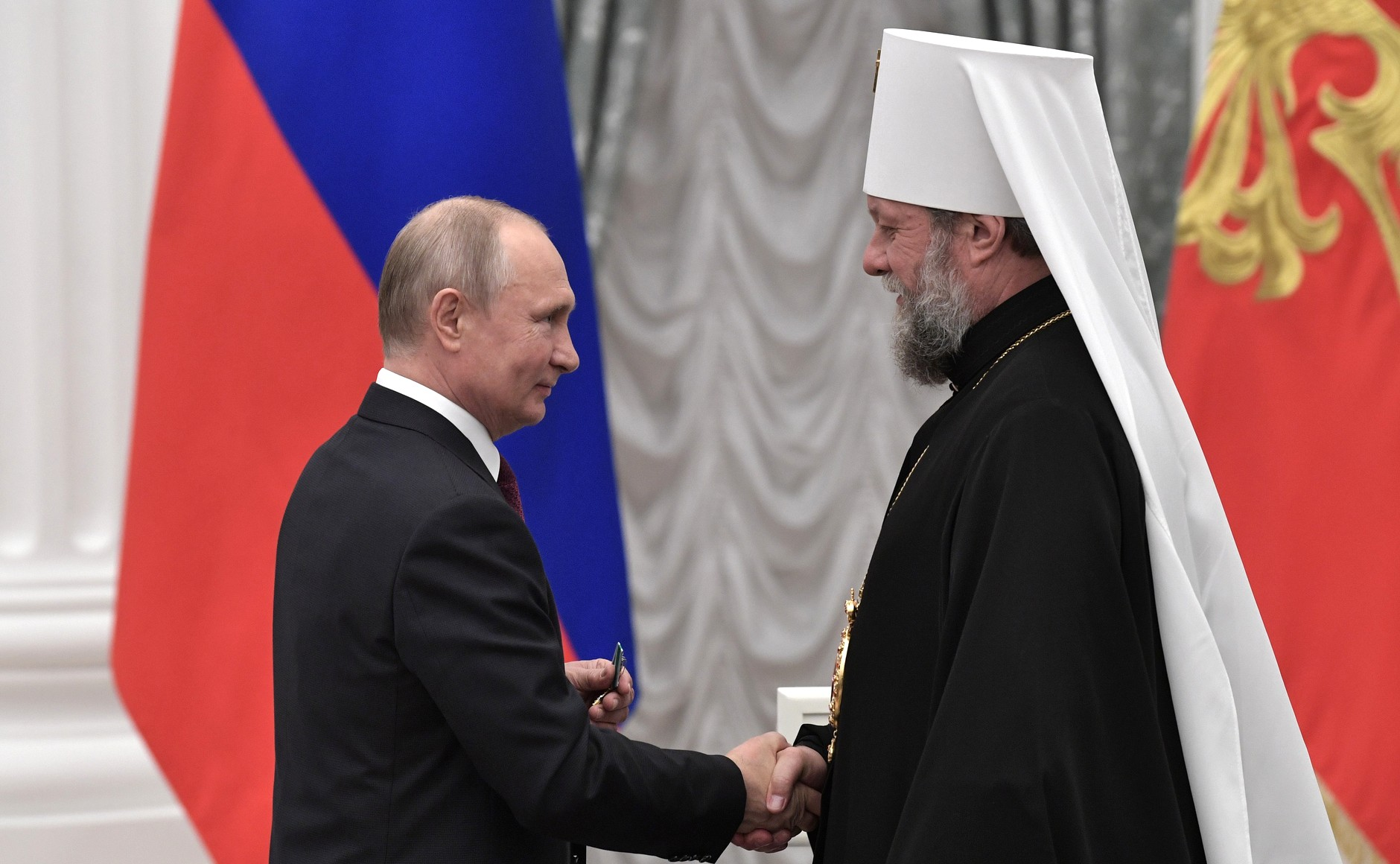
Metropolitan Vladimir with Russian President Vladimir Putin in 2019.

At the Russian Orthodox Council of Bishops in August 2000 Metropolitan Vladimir was elected a permanent member of the Russian Orthodox Holy Synod.

In addition to Moldovan citizenship, Metropolitan Vladimir confirmed that he also has Russian and Ukrainian citizenships. Romanian MEP stated that, despite his pro-Russian stance, the Metropolitan is also a Romanian citizen.

Various press websites in Moldova and Romania claim that Metropolitan Vladimir is a former KGB officer, holding the rank of colonel. This information was confirmed by former Defense Ministers of Moldova Valeriu Pasat and Victor Gaiciuc.

== Sources ==
- Vladimir, Metropolitan of Chișinău and All Moldova (in Russian)
