= Kolinkivtsi =

Village in Chernivtsi Oblast, Ukraine

Coordinates: 48.4131°N 26.1294°E

Kolinkivtsi (Ukrainian: Колінківці; Romanian: Colincăuți or previously Colencăuți) is a village in Chernivtsi Raion, Chernivtsi Oblast, Ukraine.

Until 18 July 2020, Kolinkivtsi belonged to Khotyn Raion. The raion was abolished in July 2020 as part of the administrative reform of Ukraine, which reduced the number of raions of Chernivtsi Oblast to three. The area of Khotyn Raion was merged into Dniester Raion. However, Kolinkivtsi, together with Hrozyntsi and Bochkivtsi, belonged to Toporyvtsi rural hromada, based in Novoselytsia Raion. After the reform, these villages were transferred to Chernivtsi Raion. In 2001, 91.14% of the inhabitants spoke Romanian as their native language, while 8.5% spoke Ukrainian.

== Natives ==
- Lukyan Anatychuk (1937–2024), physicist
- Vladimir (Cantarean) (born 1952), bishop of the Moldovan Orthodox Church
