= Diocese of Yaroslavl =

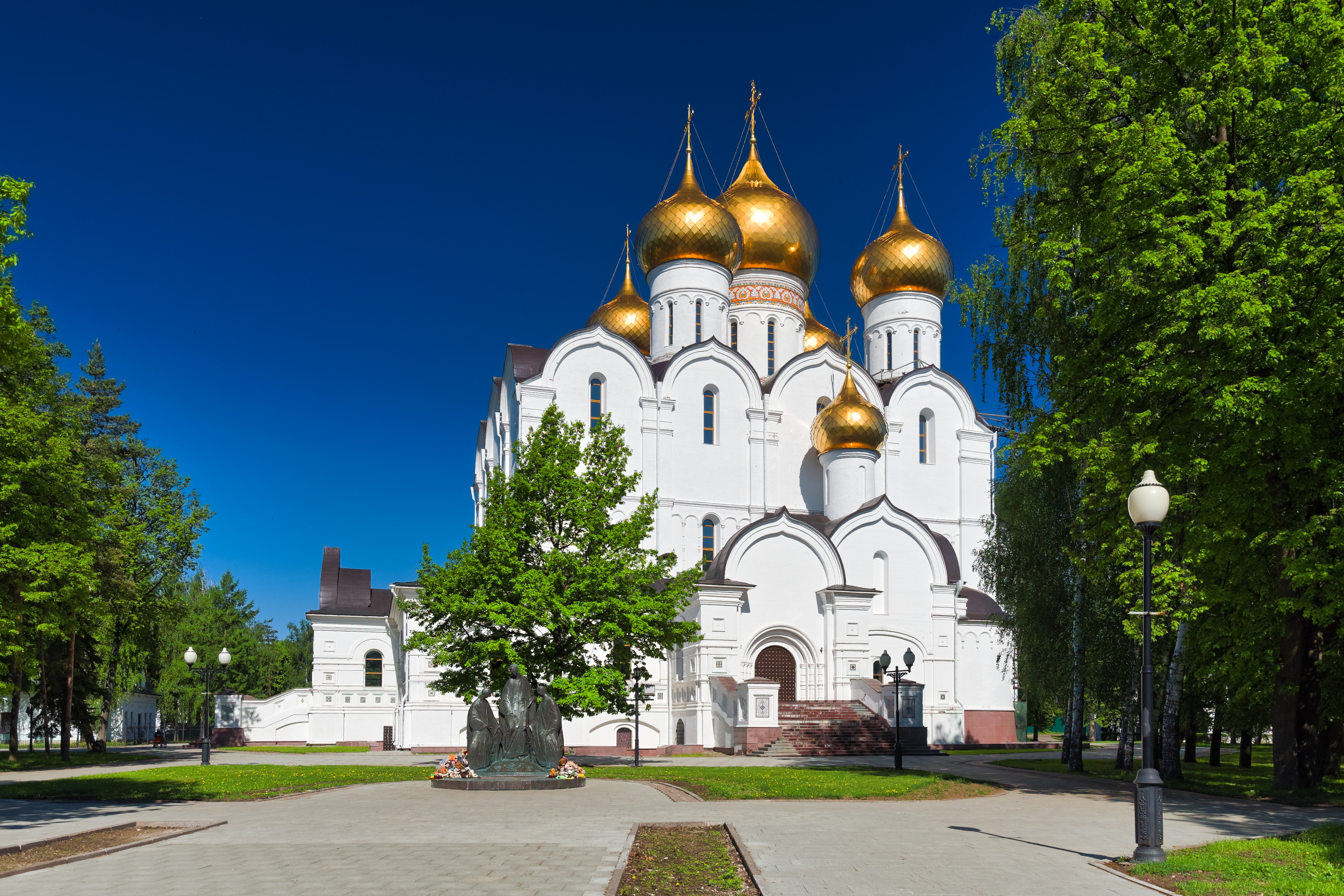
- Transfiguration Cathedral

Location
- Deaneries: 10
- Headquarters: Yaroslavl

Statistics
- Parishes: 125
- Churches: 11

Information
- Denomination: Eastern Orthodox
- Sui iuris church: Russian Orthodox Church
- Established: 991 (formally 1788)
- Cathedral: Transfiguration Cathedral
- Language: Old Church Slavonic

Current leadership
- Governance: Eparchy
- Bishop: Vadim (Lazebny) since 26 December 2019

Website
- www.yareparhia.ru

The Diocese of Yaroslavl and Rostov (Russian: Ярославская и Ростовская епархия) is an eparchy of the Russian Orthodox Church in the area of the Yaroslavl Oblast.

== History ==
Rostov and Suzdal diocese were founded in 991 with the center in Rostov.

The title of the ruling bishop has changed several times. In 1390 the diocese became an archdiocese. From 1711 to 1783 it was headed by Bishops and Archbishops and from 1783 to 1786 by Archbishops.

In 1786, an episcopal see was transferred from Rostov to Yaroslavl. At that time, 29 monasteries operated in the diocese.

From 1907 to 1913 the Yaroslavl diocese headed by Archbishop Tikhon (Bellavin), the future Patriarch of Moscow and All Russia. His successor was the Metropolitan Agafangel (Preobrazhensky) (glorified in 2000 as a hieroconfessor). In 1923-1926, Archbishop Joseph (Petrovykh) ran the diocese.
