= Kamyshinsky (rural locality) =

Kamyshinsky Камышинский
- Khutor
- Location within Volgograd Oblast Location within Russia
- Coordinates: 49°13′N 43°34′E
- Country: Russia
- Region: Volgograd Oblast
- District: Ilovlinsky District
- Time zone: UTC+4:00

Kamyshinsky (Russian: Камышинский) is a rural locality (a khutor) in Sirotinskoye Rural Settlement, Ilovlinsky District, Volgograd Oblast, Russia. The population was 271 as of 2010. There are 4 streets.

== Geography ==
Kamyshinsky is located in steppe, on south of the Volga Upland, 64 km west of Ilovlya (the district's administrative centre) by road. Shokhinsky is the nearest rural locality.
