= Khotyn Raion =

Former subdivision of Chernivtsi Oblast, Ukraine

Khotyn Raion Хотинський район
- Raion
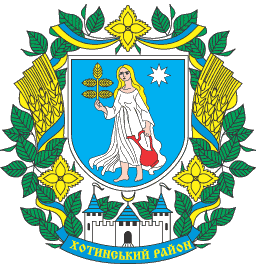
- Flag Coat of arms

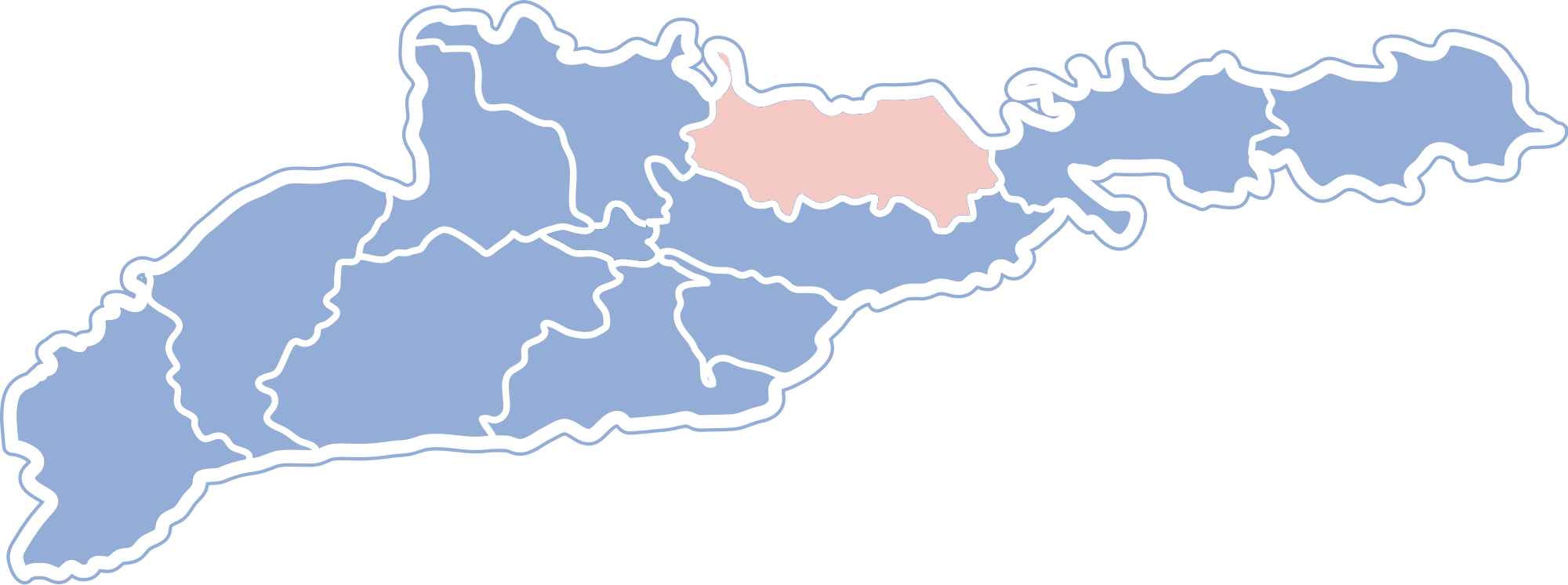
- Coordinates: 48°26′31″N 26°19′30″E
- Country: Ukraine
- Region: Chernivtsi Oblast
- Established: 1940
- Disestablished: 18 July 2020
- Admin. center: Khotyn
- Subdivisions: List: — city councils; — settlement councils; — rural councils; Number of localities: — cities; — urban-type settlements; 38 — villages; — rural settlements

Area
  - Total: 716 km^{2} (276 sq mi)

Population (2020)
  - Total: 60,515
  - Density: 84.5/km^{2} (219/sq mi)
- Time zone: UTC+02:00 (EET)
  - Summer (DST): UTC+03:00 (EEST)
- Postal index: 600xx
- Area code: 380 3731

Khotyn Raion (Ukrainian: Хотинський район) was an administrative raion (district) in the southern part of Chernivtsi Oblast in western Ukraine, on the Romanian border. It was part of the historical region of Bessarabia. The administrative center was the city of Khotyn. The region had an area of 716 square kilometres (276 mi^{2}). The raion was abolished on 18 July 2020 as part of the administrative reform of Ukraine, which reduced the number of raions of Chernivtsi Oblast to three. The area of Khotyn Raion was merged into Dniester Raion. According to the 2001 census, the majority of the Khotyn district's population spoke Ukrainian (91.57%), with Romanian (6.96%) and Russian (1.27%) speakers in the minority. The last estimate of the raion population was 60,515 (2020 est.)

At the time of disestablishment, the raion consisted of eight hromadas:

- Khotyn urban hromada with the administration in Khotyn;
- Klishkivtsi rural hromada with the administration in the selo of Klishkivtsi;
- Nedoboivtsi rural hromada with the administration in the selo of Nedoboivtsi;
- Rukshyn rural hromada with the administration in the selo of Rukshyn.

Three villages, Kolinkivtsi, Hrozyntsi, and Bochkivtsi, belonged to Toporyvtsi rural hromada, mainly based in Novoselytsia Raion. After the reform, they were transferred to Chernivtsi Raion.

== See also ==
- Subdivisions of Ukraine
