= Marcel Olteanu =

Romanian general

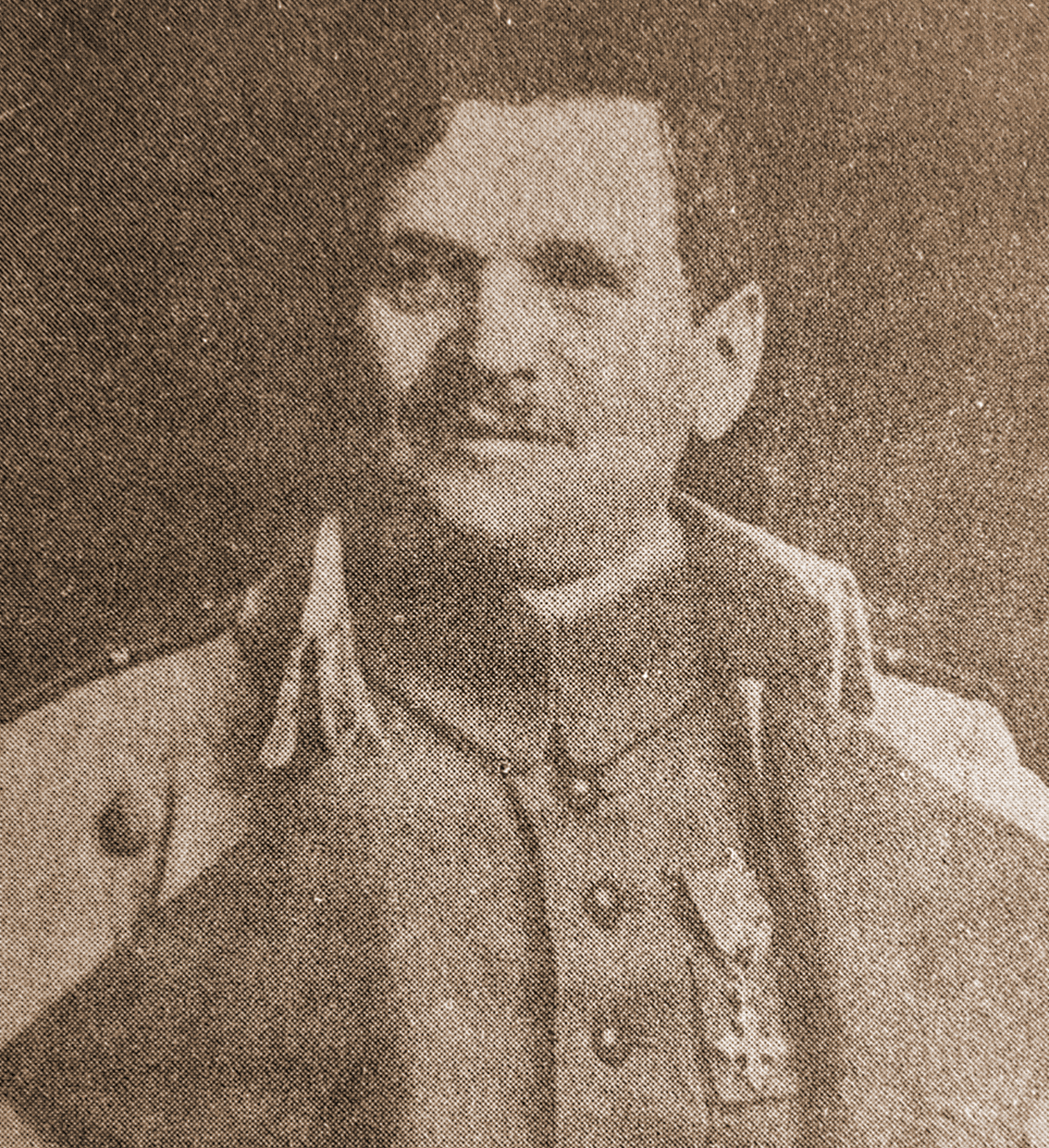
- General Marcel Olteanu in 1918
- Born: May 4, 1872; Craiova, Romania
- Died: 1943 (aged 70–71); Bucharest, Romania
- Alma mater: Higher War School
- Children: Marcel M. Olteanu (son)
- Relatives: Adelina Olteanu (sister)
- Military career
- Allegiance: Kingdom of Romania
- Branch: Army (Cavalry)
- Service years: 1891–1919
- Rank: Brigadier general
- Commands: 3rd Roșiori Brigade; 6th Infantry Division
- Conflicts: Second Balkan War; World War I; Romanian campaign; Hungarian–Romanian War
- Awards: Order of the Crown, Officer rank Order of the Crown, Commander rank Order of Michael the Brave, 3rd Class

Marcel Olteanu (May 4, 1872 – 1943) was a Romanian brigadier general during World War I and the Hungarian–Romanian War.

He was born in Craiova, a descendant of Petru Maior. His sister, Adelina, later married Octavian Codru Tăslăuanu. In 1889 he went to Bucharest, where he enlisted in the Military School of Infantry and Cavalry, graduating in 1891 with the rank of second lieutenant, after which he advanced to lieutenant (1894), captain (1900), and major (1910). Also in 1910, Olteanu was awarded the Order of the Crown, Officer rank. He completed his studies at the Higher War School in Bucharest. Olteanu served in the Second Balkan War in 1913, and was decorated with the Avântul Țării Medal. He was promoted to lieutenant colonel in April 1914 and colonel in May 1916. Starting in October 1912, Olteanu was the inaugural commandant of the "Nicolae Filipescu" Military School at Dealu Monastery; he served in this position until August 1918.

After Romania entered World War I in August 1916, Olteanu was put in command of the 2nd Călărași Regiment, and then served as Chief of Staff of the First Army Corps. He was promoted to brigadier general in 1917, and became commanding officer of the 3rd Roșiori Brigade. He distinguished himself at the Third Battle of Oituz in July–August 1917, especially at the engagement at Coșna Hill against German forces. (His son, Marcel M. Olteanu, a graduate of the Dealu Monastery military school, also fought in this battle.) For his valor Olteanu was awarded in September 1920 the Order of Michael the Brave, 3rd class. In early December 1917, he was put in charge of the central command of the Romanian Volunteer Corps in Russia, based in Hârlău, Iași County.

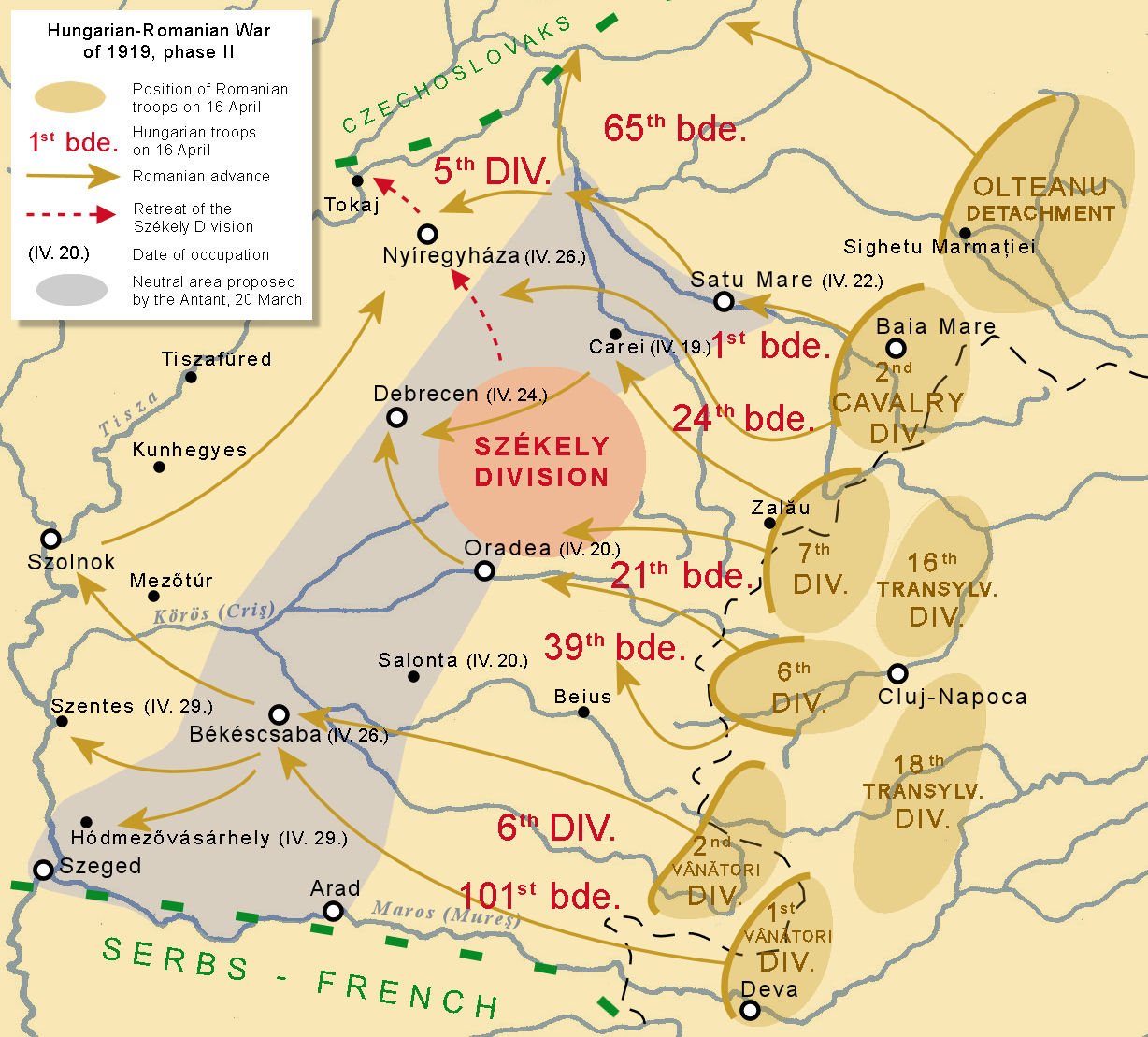
The Hungarian–Romanian War of 1919 and the Romanian advance to the Tisza; the Olteanu Detachment is at the extreme north

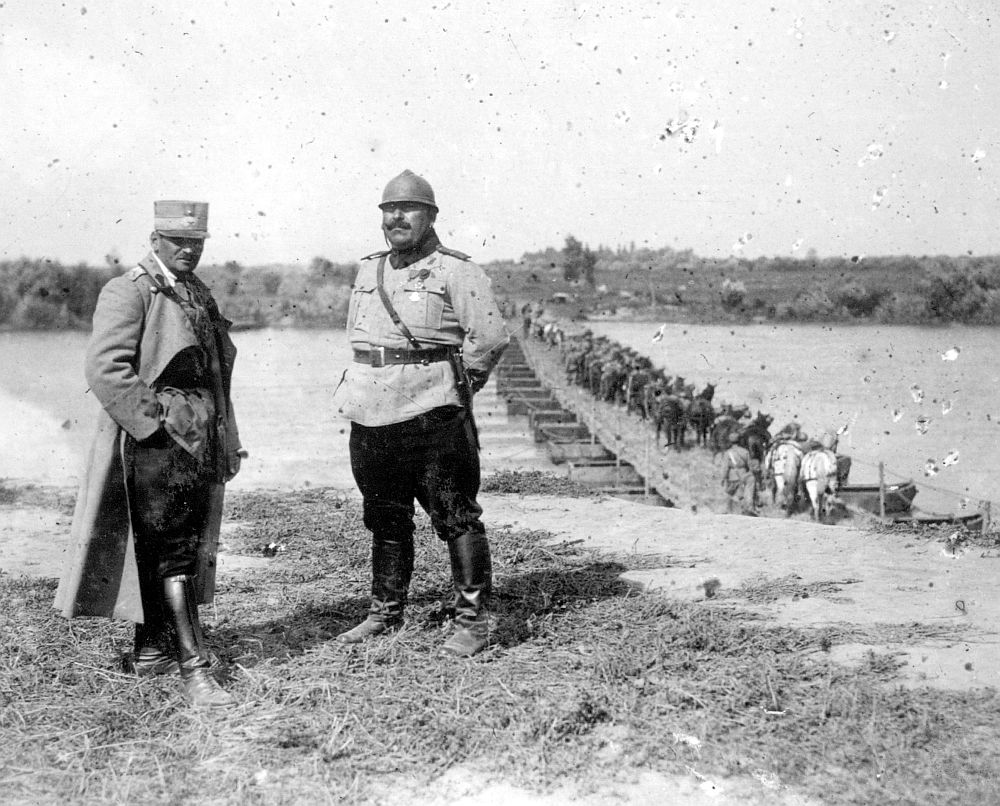
Generals Olteanu and Traian Moșoiu during the crossing of the Tisza in 1919

In 1918, Olteanu was given command of the 6th Infantry Division. The next year he fought in the Hungarian–Romanian War. On 21 March 1919 Béla Kun led a successful communist coup d'état in Hungary; he formed a social democratic, communist coalition government and proclaimed the Hungarian Soviet Republic. General Gheorghe Mărdărescu was in command of the Romanian army in Transylvania, with General Traian Moșoiu in command of the Army Group North, and with the Olteanu Detachment (centered around Sighetu Marmației) attached to it. By 18 April, the first elements of the Romanian offensive were completed and the Hungarian front was broken. For his role in securing the Maramureș region, King Ferdinand I of Romania awarded Olteanu the Order of the Crown, Commander rank, in a ceremony held at Baia Mare on 26 May. In late July the Romanian Army crossed the Tisza River and advanced towards Budapest, leading to the collapse of the Hungarian Soviet Republic. From August to November 1919, Olteanu served as military governor of Budapest.

After the war, Olteanu retired from the army, and was put in reserve with the First Army Corps. He died in Bucharest in 1943. A street in Cilieni, Olt County now bears his name.

== Publications ==
- Deprinderi tactice pentru tinerii ofițeri din toate armele [Tactical skills for young officers in all weapons] (in Romanian). București: Institutul Grafic Universala, Iancu Ionescu. 1910.
- Huzarul negru. Carte ostășească, ostașilor români [The black hussar. Military book for the Romanian soldiers] (in Romanian) (2nd ed.). București: Editura Institutul de Arte Grafice Răsăritul. 1926 [1915].
