= Traian Moșoiu =

Romanian general

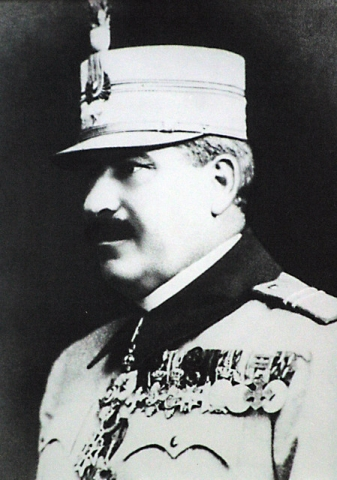
- General Traian Moșoiu
- Born: 2 July 1868; Újtohán, Austria-Hungary (now Zărnești, Brașov County, Romania)
- Died: 15 August 1932 (aged 64); Bucharest, Kingdom of Romania
- Burial place: Bellu Cemetery, Bucharest
- Alma mater: Ludovica Academy; Theresian Military Academy
- Spouse: Maria Furtunescu (m. 1897)
- Children: Tiberiu, Mariana
- Military career
- Allegiance: Romanian Army
- Branch: Infantry
- Service years: 1891–1932
- Rank: General
- Conflicts: Second Balkan War; World War I; Romanian campaign; Hungarian–Romanian War
- Awards: Order of Michael the Brave, 3rd Class

Minister of War
- In office 2 March 1920 – 11 March 1920
- Prime Minister: Alexandru Vaida-Voevod
- Preceded by: Ioan Rășcanu
- Succeeded by: Ioan Rășcanu

Minister of Communications
- In office 24 January 1922 – 29 October 1923
- Prime Minister: Ion I. C. Brătianu
- Preceded by: Constantin Angelescu
- Succeeded by: Artur Văitoianu

Minister of Public Works
- In office 30 October 1923 – 29 March 1926
- Prime Minister: Ion I. C. Brătianu
- Preceded by: Aurel Cosma
- Succeeded by: Petru Groza

Traian Moșoiu (2 July 1868 – 15 August 1932) was a Romanian general during World War I and the Hungarian–Romanian War. He held the posts of Minister of War in the Alexandru Vaida-Voevod cabinet (December 1919 – March 1920), Minister of Communications and of Industry and Commerce in the Ion I. C. Brătianu cabinet (January 1922 – March 1926).

== Early life ==
Moșoiu was born in 1868 in the village Újtohán, at the time in Austria-Hungary, now Tohanul Nou, part of Zărnești, Brașov County, Romania. He was the son of Ana, née Răduțoiu, and Moise, a shepherd who later became mayor of Újtohán. He went to the Andrei Șaguna High School in Brassó, then studied at the Ludovica Academy in Budapest and the Theresian Military Academy in Vienna. He graduated from the latter academy on 1 June 1889 with the rank of second lieutenant in the Austro-Hungarian Army, and was sent to the Nagyszeben garrison. In 1891 he got into conflicts with fellow officers after he cried foul at the Hungarians, making demands for the equal rights of the ethnic Romanians within the Habsburg Empire. As a result, he was arrested and imprisoned, but, with his father's help, he managed to escape. He then crossed the Bucegi Mountains into Romania, arriving in Sinaia, where he surrendered to the authorities, asking to join the Romanian Army ranks.

== Career in the Romanian Army ==
In April 1893 he became a second lieutenant with the 9th Infantry Regiment, garrisoned at Râmnicu Vâlcea, advancing to lieutenant the next year and to captain in 1900. On 27 July 1897 in Buzău he married Maria Furtunescu, a French teacher; they had two children, Tiberiu (b. 1898) and Mariana (b. 1903). Moșoiu commanded companies in the 19th Regiment Romanați (1901–1904) and the 9th Battalion Vânători in Ploiești, the 1st Infantry Battalion of the 20th Regiment Muscel, the 6th Regiment Mihai Viteazul in Bucharest, and the 7th Battalion Vânători in Galați. He was promoted to major in 1909.

He saw action in the military campaign in Bulgaria during the Second Balkan War and on 1 October 1913, he was appointed commander of the 30th Regiment Vânători at Câmpulung, holding the rank of lieutenant-colonel. He was promoted to colonel on 1 April 1916.

== World War I ==
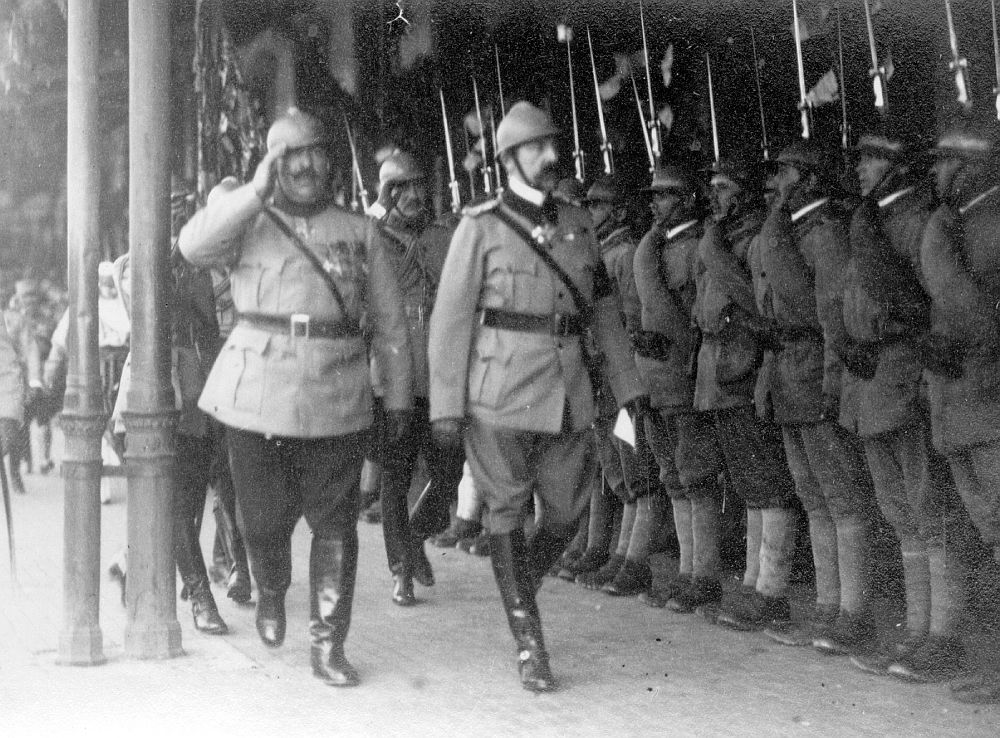
Moșoiu and King Ferdinand saluting the Royal Guards at the Nagykároly train station (1919)

Romania was neutral for the first two years of World War I, entering on the side of the Allied powers on 27 August 1916. The start of the Romanian Campaign of 1916 found Moșoiu as commanding officer of 2nd Regiment Vâlcea and commander of the military group assigned to the Olt–Lotru sector, when he played a decisive role in the Nagyszeben Offensive. From 26 to 29 September the 3rd Infantry Brigade under his command fought tenaciously in the Olt Valley with the 1st Army Corps led by General David Praporgescu, blocking an attempted breakthrough of the 9th German Army under the command of Erich von Falkenhayn. In October 1916 he took command of the 23rd Infantry Division. In January 1917 he was promoted to brigadier general and put in command of the 12th Infantry Division. For his bravery during the Battle of Transylvania in the fall of 1916 he was awarded on 2 January 1918 the Order of Michael the Brave, 3rd Class.

On 3 March 1918, after the October Revolution, the Bolsheviks signed a separate peace with the Central Powers in the Treaty of Brest-Litovsk. Romania was alone on the Eastern Front, a situation that far surpassed its military capabilities; therefore, on 7 May 1918, Romania sued for peace. On 10 November 1918 Romania re-entered the war on the side of the Allies. King Ferdinand called for the mobilization of the Romanian army and ordered it to attack by crossing the Carpathian Mountains into Transylvania. The end of World War I that soon followed did not bring an end to fighting for the Romanian army; its mission continued into 1918 and 1919 in the Hungarian–Romanian War.

== The Hungarian–Romanian War ==
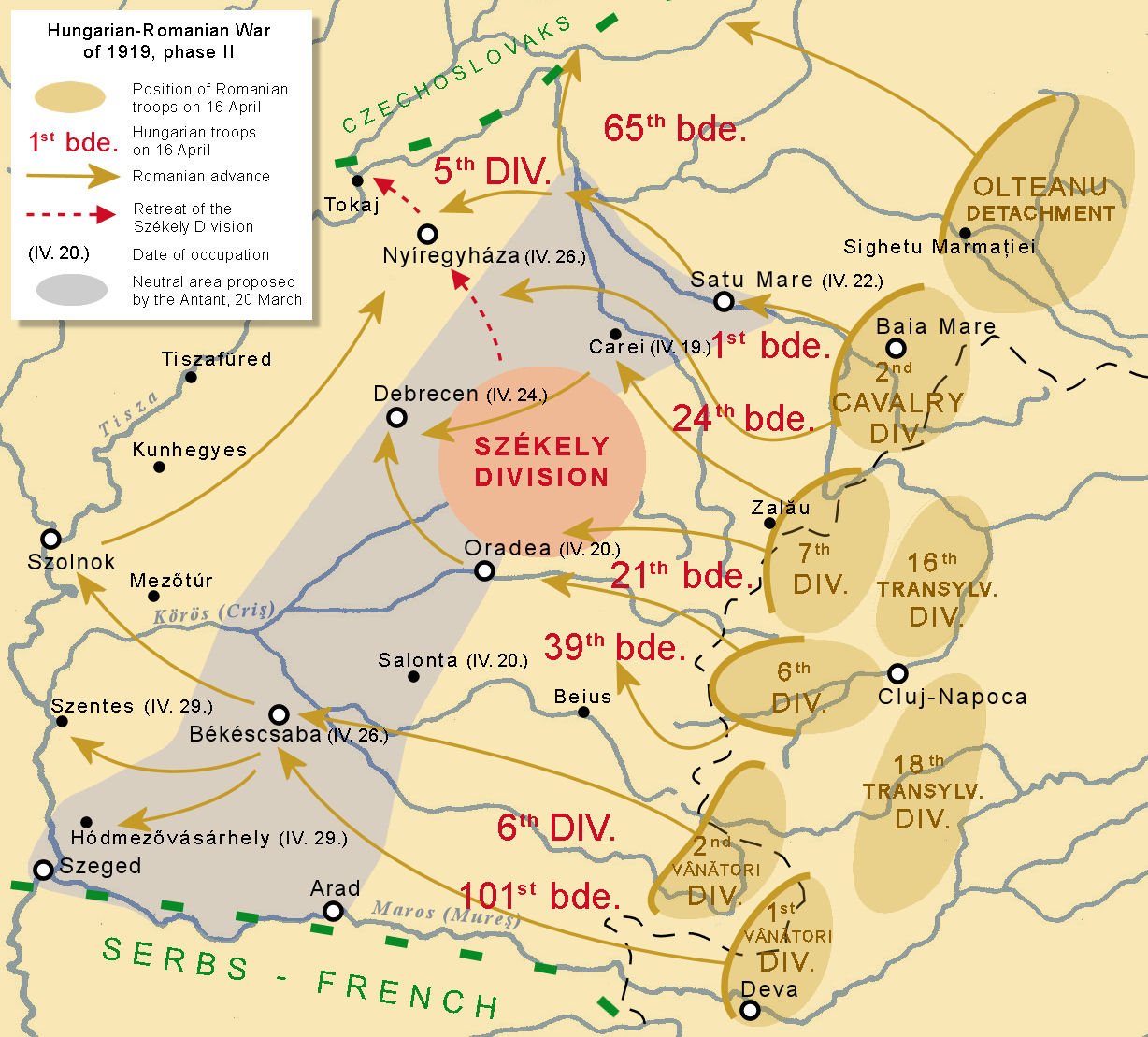
Hungarian–Romanian War of 1919: Romanian advance to the Tisza

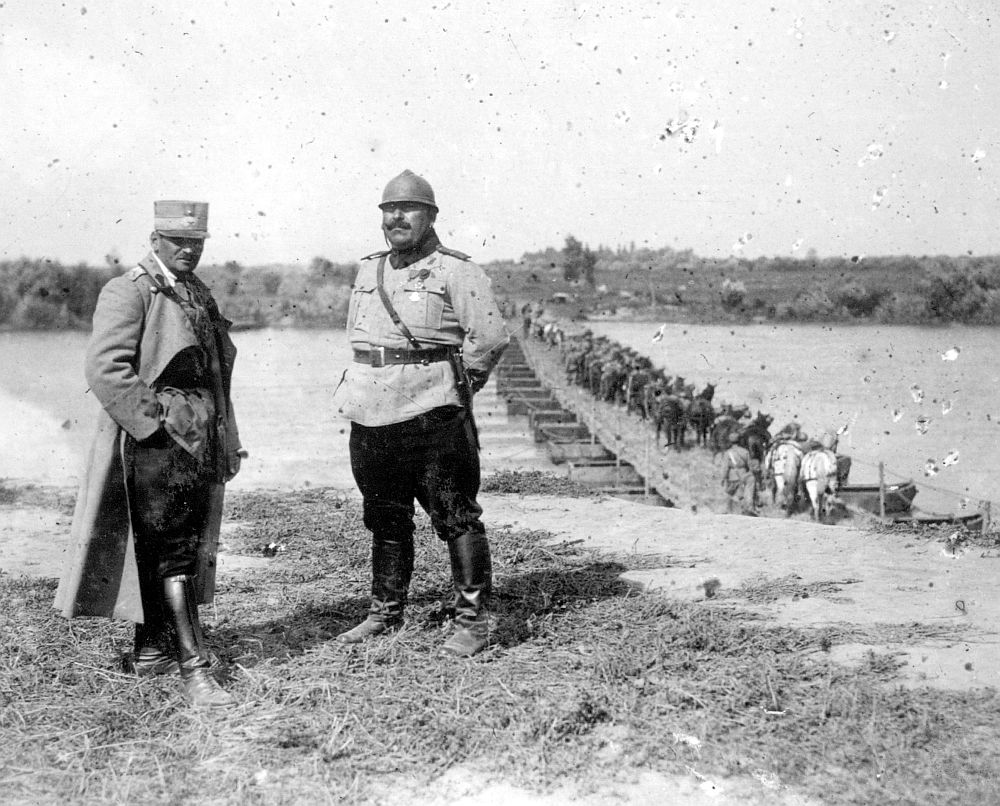
Generals Marcel Olteanu and Moșoiu during the crossing of the Tisza

At the end of November 1918, the 7th Infantry Division under the command of Moșoiu crossed the Carpathians, coming from Piatra Neamț and advancing though the Prisăcani Valley towards Borszék, Maroshévíz, and Szászrégen. On 1 December 1918, the Union of Transylvania with Romania was officiated by the elected representatives of the Romanian people of Transylvania. Later that month, Romanian units reached the line of the Mureș River, which was the demarcation line agreed upon by the representatives of the Allied powers and Hungary. On 10 December, a unified command of the Romanian army in Transylvania was established; its headquarters were at Nagyszeben, with Moșoiu in command. On 12 March 1919 he was appointed Military Governor of Transylvania.

On 21 March Béla Kun led a successful communist coup d'état in Hungary; he formed a social democratic, communist coalition government and proclaimed the Hungarian Soviet Republic. General Gheorghe Mărdărescu was in command of the Romanian army in Transylvania, with General Moșoiu in command of the Army Group North. By 18 April, the first elements of the Romanian offensive were completed and the Hungarian front was broken. Moșoiu's troops took control of western Transylvania, including the cities of Șimleu Silvaniei and Belényes. He entered Nagyvárad on 20 April alongside General Ștefan Holban, and took control of the administration of the city that day. His troops then advanced to Nagyszalonta, Nagykároly, and Szatmárnémeti, pressing on to the Tisza River. The Hungarian forces retreated to Szolnok and from there across the Tisza, establishing two concentric defense lines. Between 29 April and 1 May, the Romanian Army broke through these lines, establishing control on the entire east bank of the Tisza. On 2 May, Hungary sued for peace, with Kun prepared to recognize all of Romania's territorial demands. General Moșoiu became the governor of the military district between the Romanian border and the Tisza River.

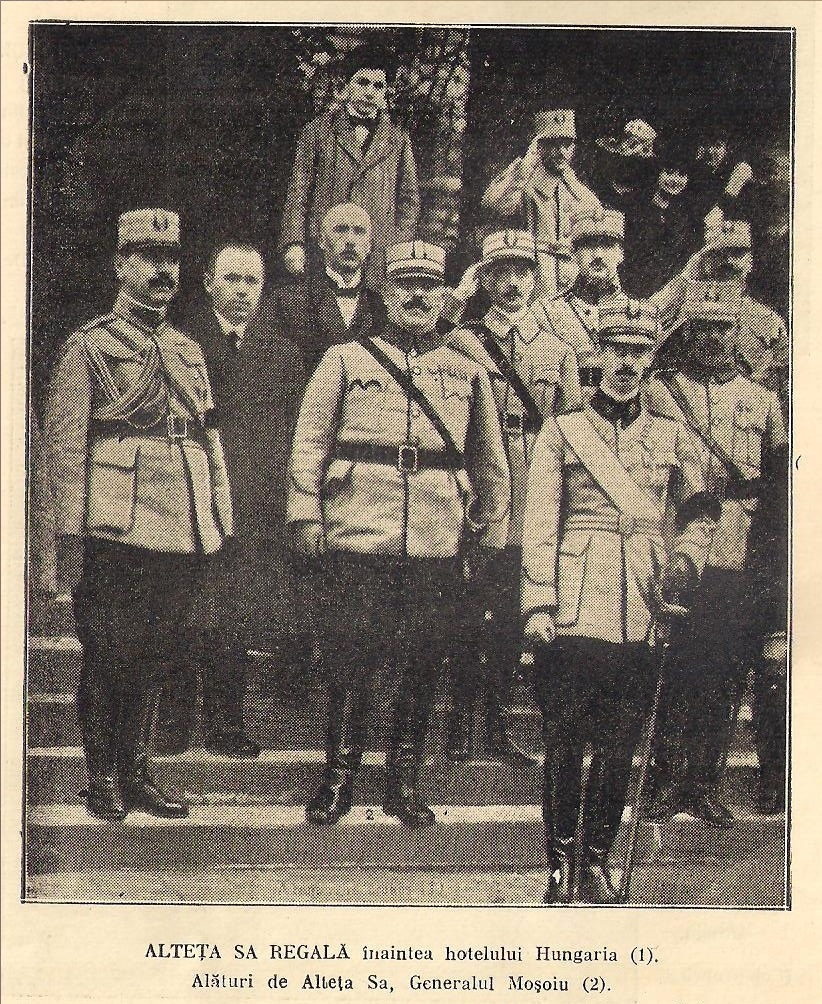
Crown Prince Carol II (front) with General Moșoiu (center) in Budapest, 5 October 1919

After repelling attacks by the Hungarian Army in July 1919, the Romanian Army crossed the Tisza River at the end of the month and advanced towards Budapest. On 2 August, Kun fled Hungary towards the Austrian border and eventually reached the Soviet Union. On 3–4 August some 400 Romanian soldiers with two artillery guns took hold of the city. Soon after, the bulk of the Romanian troops arrived in the Budapest and a parade was held through the city center in front of their commander, General Moșoiu. Romanian forces continued their advance into Hungary, stopping at Győr; they occupied all of Hungary with the exception of an area around Lake Balaton. Moșoiu was named commander of the Romanian military garrison in Budapest and Military Governor of the Hungarian territory to the west of the Tisza River.

== Political career ==
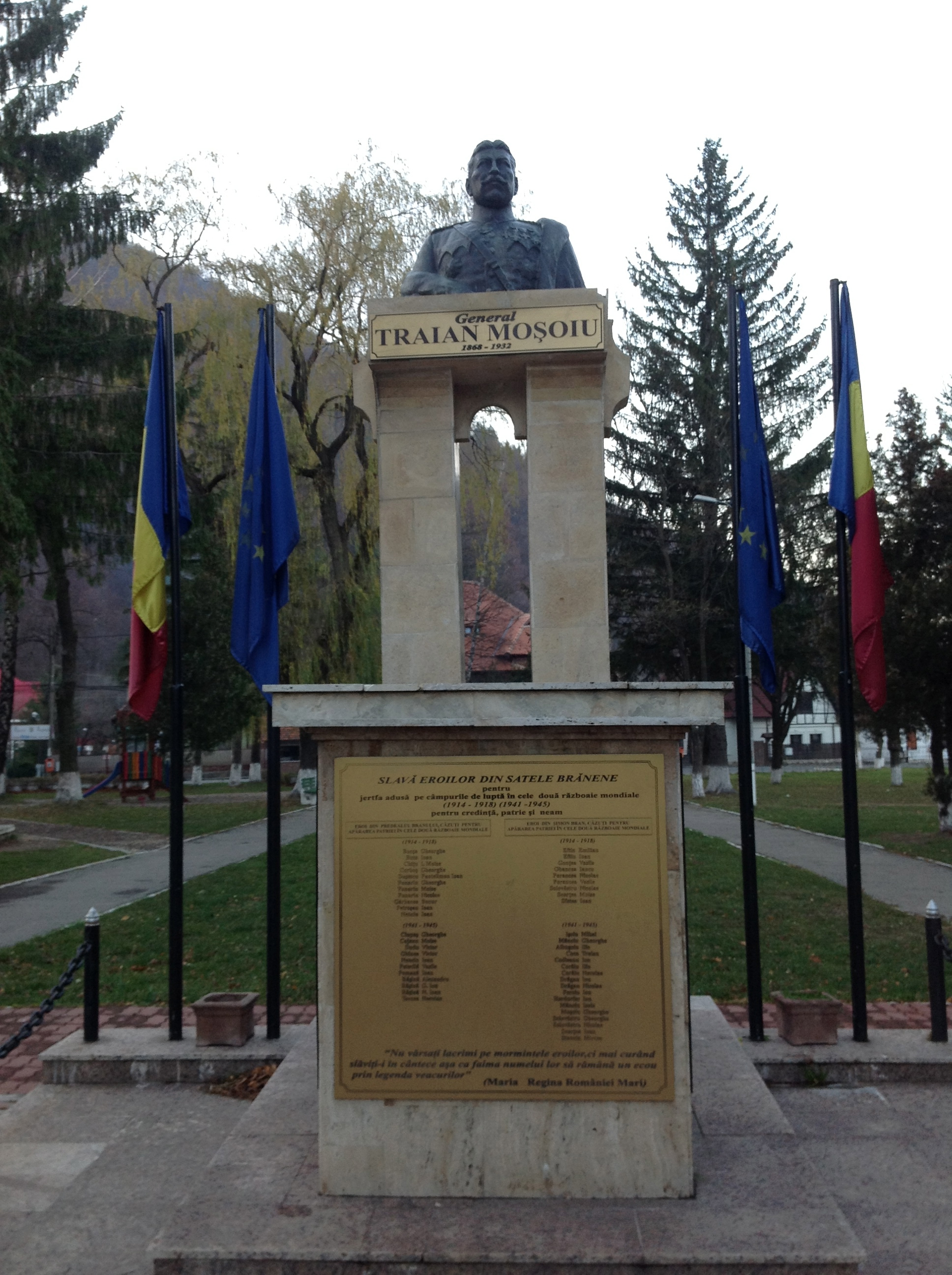
Bust of Moșoiu at Bran

In December 1919 he retired from the Army, joining the National Liberal Party after 1920. He served as Minister of War in the Alexandru Vaida-Voevod cabinet for 11 days in March 1920. From January 1922 to October 1923, he was Communications Minister, supporting administrative and fiscal autonomy for Căile Ferate Române railway. From December 1923 to March 1926, he was Minister of Public Works, in which capacity he promoted clean water.

Elected Senator for Bihor County in 1922, he served a second term as ex officio member from 1926. During the 1922 campaign, his rival, Aurel Vlad of the Romanian National Party, was detained for three hours while en route to a rally in Orăștie, for purposes of intimidation.

Moșoiu died in Bucharest on 15 August 1932. He is buried at Bellu Cemetery, in Bucharest.

== Legacy ==
Streets are named after him in Arad, Bran, Brașov, Cluj-Napoca, Oradea, Ploiești, and Târgu Mureș. In 2006, the CFR railway station in Zărnești was named in his honor.

A bust of him, sculpted by Teodor Zamfirescu, was unveiled in Oradea in 1992; the monument was rehabilitated in 2019, on the occasion of the centenary of Moșoiu's troops taking control of the city and establishing Romanian administration there. In 2007, on the 75th anniversary of his death, a bust of Moșoiu was erected in Bran, Brașov County; the inaugural ceremony was attended by then-President Traian Băsescu.

== Notes ==
Military offices
Preceded by Ioan Rășcanu	Minister of War; 2 March 1920 – 11 March 1920	Succeeded by Ioan Rășcanu
