= Dănilă Papp =

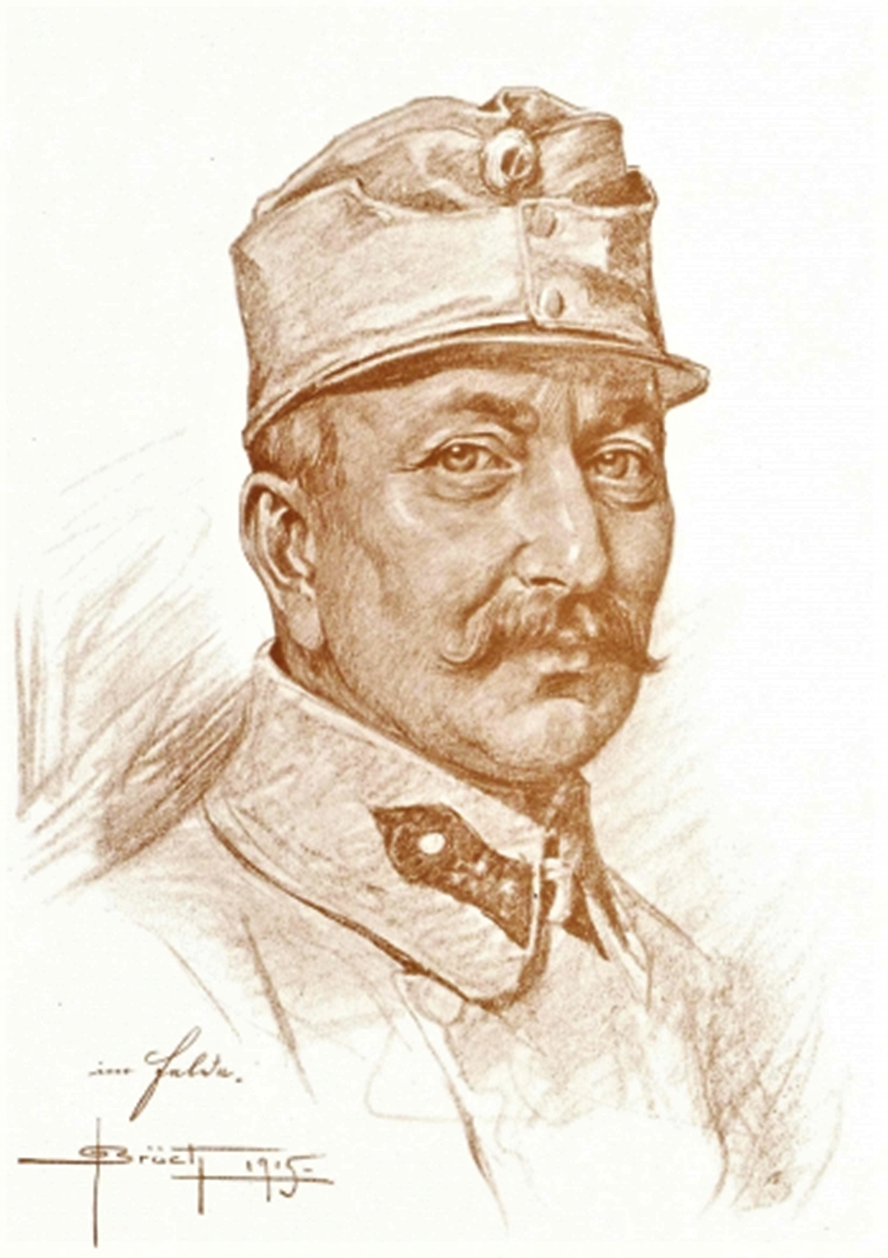
- Dănilă ("Daniel") Papp as Oberstleutnant
- Born: Dănilă Papp; 20 May 1868; Aciuva (now Avram Iancu), Austria-Hungary
- Died: 30 March 1950 (aged 81) Sibiu, Romania
- Buried: Sibiu
- Allegiance: Austria-Hungary; Romania
- Branch: Austro-Hungarian Army (1890-1918); Romanian Army (1918-1934)
- Service years: 1890-1934
- Rank: Major General (Romania); Oberst (Austria-Hungary)
- Commands: VI Army Corps (1924-1930); I Army Corps (1923); 18th Infantry Division (1919-1923); Papp Brigade (1915-1918)
- Conflicts: First World War; Eastern Front; Italian front; Hungarian–Romanian War
- Awards: Order of the Crown of Romania; Order of the Star of Romania; Order of the Iron Crown; Order of Leopold; Iron Cross; Military Merit Cross; Military Merit Medal
- Education: Technical University of Vienna
- Spouse: Eugenia Ivașcu
- Children: Eugen Papp (1896-1915)
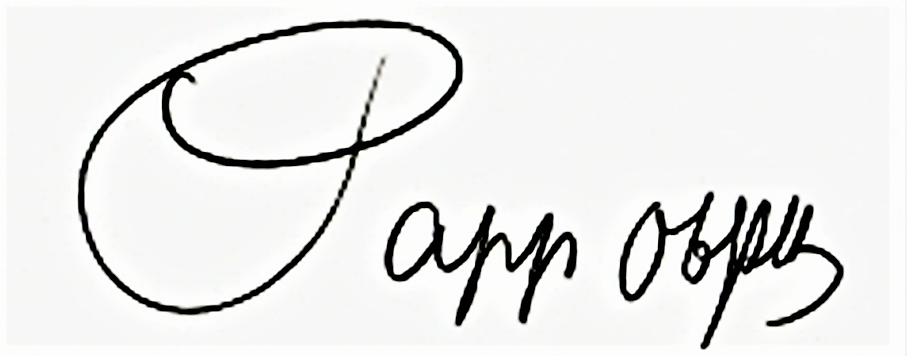
- Signature

Dănilă Papp (20 May 1868 – 30 March 1950), appearing with the name Daniel Papp in Austro-Hungarian Army records, was an Austro-Hungarian-born ethnic Romanian officer and later a Romanian General who served during World War I and the Hungarian–Romanian War.

In the Austro-Hungarian Army, he reached the rank of Oberst and commanded the so-called Papp Brigade from 1915. In the Romanian Army, he was promoted to the rank of Brigadier General in 1919 and led the 18th Infantry Division during the Hungarian–Romanian War of 1919. After retiring from the army, he was appointed governor of Mureș County and later served as ambassador to the Holy See.

== Biography ==
=== Early life and military career ===
Dănilă Papp was born on 20 May 1868 in Aciuva (today Avram Iancu), in the Kingdom of Hungary. He graduated from the Theresian Military Academy in 1890, and also followed engineering studies at the Technical University of Vienna. Receiving the rank of Leutnant on 1 September 1890, he was assigned to the 64th K.u.k. Infantry Regiment from Orăștie, a regiment with a Romanian majority of troops. In 1894, he was promoted to the rank of Oberleutnant, still assigned to the same regiment but also serving as an instructor in military engineering at the Sibiu Cadet School (Kadettenschule Hermanstadt).

He continued his service as instructor between 1895 and 1899; between 1897 and 1899, he also acted as deputy commander of the Cadet School. In 1899 he continued his studies in military engineering and fortifications at the Imperial and Royal Technical Military Academy, graduating in 1902. He was transferred to the General Staff of Engineering from Przemyśl, then to the 2nd K.u.k. Infantry Regiment from Sibiu, being promoted to the rank of Hauptleute second class around the same time. In the following years, he served in the Corps of Engineers in Komárom, then in Trento until 1914. In 1911, he received the Military Merit Cross, and was promoted to the rank of Major in 1912.

=== World War I ===
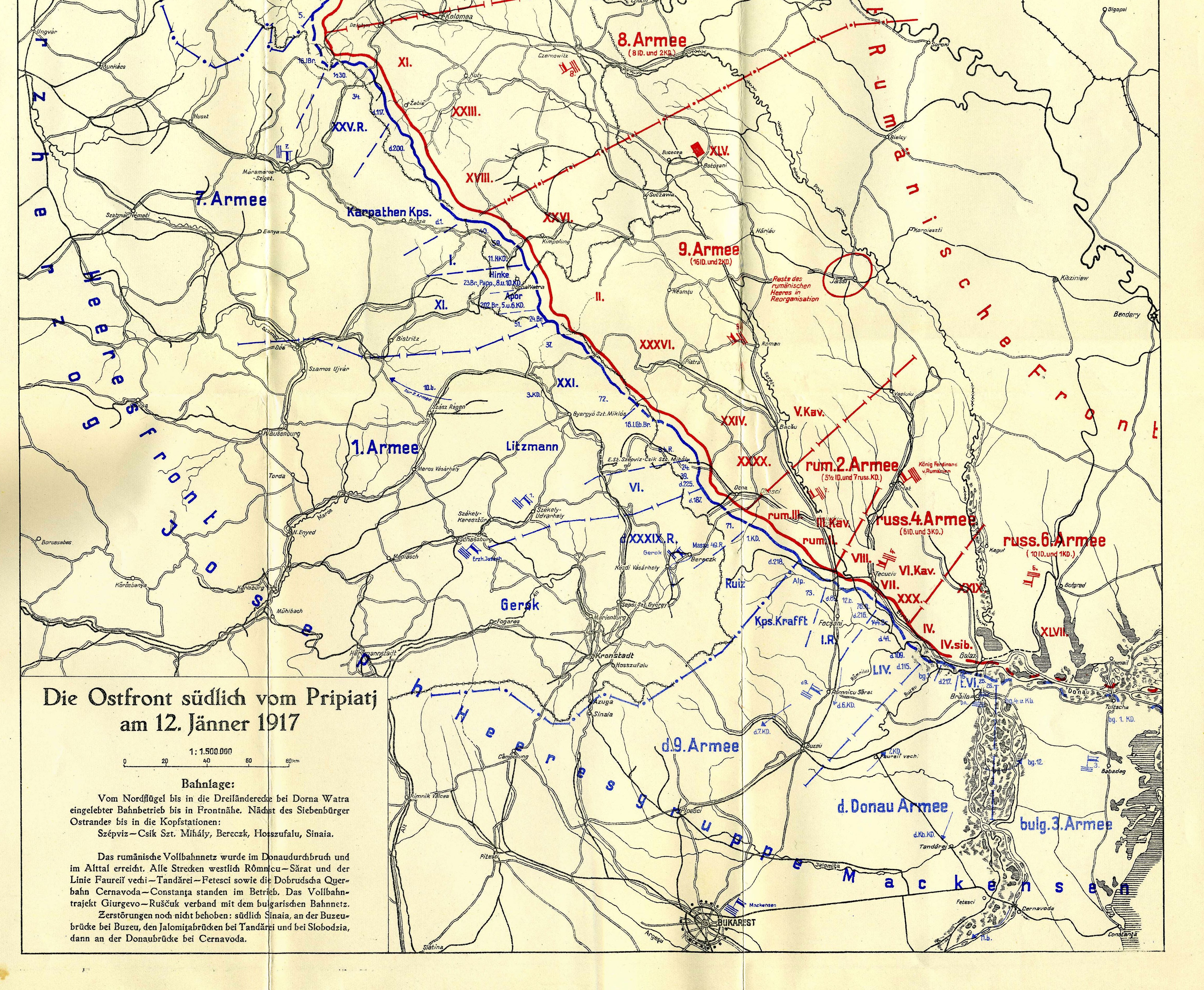
Romanian front in 1917, Papp Brigade is seen deployed near "Dorna Watra" unde Hinke

When the war started in 1914, he was still in Trento. Between 1 August and 18 September, he coordinated the construction of trenches and fortifications at Sieniawa. He took part in the defense of the bridgehead leading an Austrian unit of 10 Landsturm battalions and 10 artillery pieces. During the Battle of Sieniawa against the Russian troops, he distinguished himself by stopping the Russian flanking maneuver. For his actions, he was decorated with the Order of the Iron Crown.

==== Papp Brigade ====
Under the recommendation of General Karl von Pflanzer-Baltin, he took command of Colonel Fischer Group on 1 January 1915. The reorganized brigade was later called the "Papp Brigade" and was integrated into the XI. Army Corps. During the first half of 1915, the brigade had 4,723 soldiers, 386 horses, 14 heavy machine guns, and several artillery guns of various calibers including 30.5 cm howitzers. The number of soldiers was increased to 6,800 by autumn with soldiers coming from Landsturm units, Imperial infantry, as well as volunteer and Hussar units.

The brigade participated in the Battle of Cârlibaba, being deployed on the first line of defense. In February, Papp also participated in the recapture of Cernăuți. After his advance to the rank of Oberstleutnant on 1 March 1915, he was sent to a training course for staff officers and, after completing the course, was named chief of staff of the 54th Infantry Division. Between 15 March and 5 April, the troops under his command cleared the Russian troops from Mahala, Rarancea, Sadagura, Toporăuți, as well as several other settlements in eastern Bukovina.

As commanding officer of the Imperial forces in Bukovina, he oversaw the construction of a fortification system in the Cârlibaba-Iacobeni area and managed to stop several Russian attacks between June and December 1915. The same year, in March, he received the news that his son, Eugen Papp, had died fighting on the Italian front.

From the end of December 1915 and in January 1916, new Russian offensives were launched. Papp managed to stop them but his brigade also suffered high losses, being reduced to 50% in strength. In June 1916, he was ordered to defend the city of Cernăuți. New Russian attacks as part of the Brusilov offensive were repelled in the following days, but due to mounting losses, the IX Corps was forced to retreat. Papp's brigade reorganized itself in Câmpulung Moldovenesc but was forced into further retreat to the Iacobeni-Vatra Dornei area. In mid-August 1916, Papp received reinforcements, allowing him to organize better defenses, and stabilize the frontline. On 1 September 1916, Papp was promoted to the rank of Oberst for "loyalty and extraordinary military-tactical service". Papp's brigade remained deployed in Bukovina until April 1917, when it was moved to the Italian front under the command of the 74th Honvéd Infantry Division. It remained there until 1918, when it laid down its arms at Bolzano after the dissolution of Austria-Hungary.

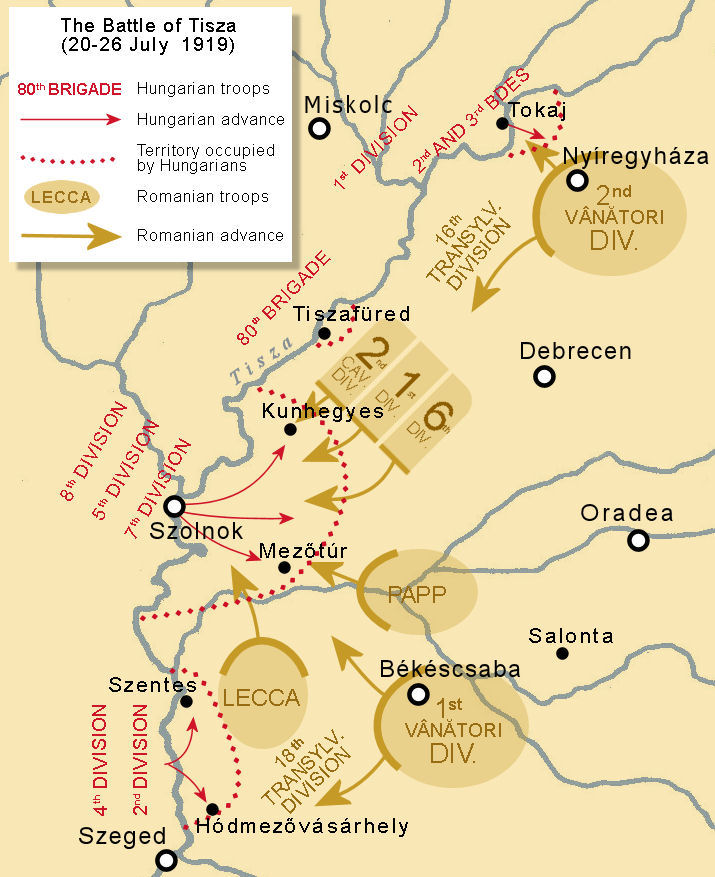
Papp's division during the Battle of Tisza, 20–26 July 1919

=== Hungarian–Romanian War ===
After the Union of Transylvania with Romania, he was appointed to the Directing Council of Transylvania and promoted to the rank of Brigadier General, being assigned as chief of staff of General Ioan Boeriu. Later, he was appointed commander of the 18th Transylvanian Infantry Division. Commanding this unit, he took part in the Hungarian–Romanian War of 1919. His division was assigned to the Southern Group tasked with the defense of the Tisza in May 1919.

=== Later career ===
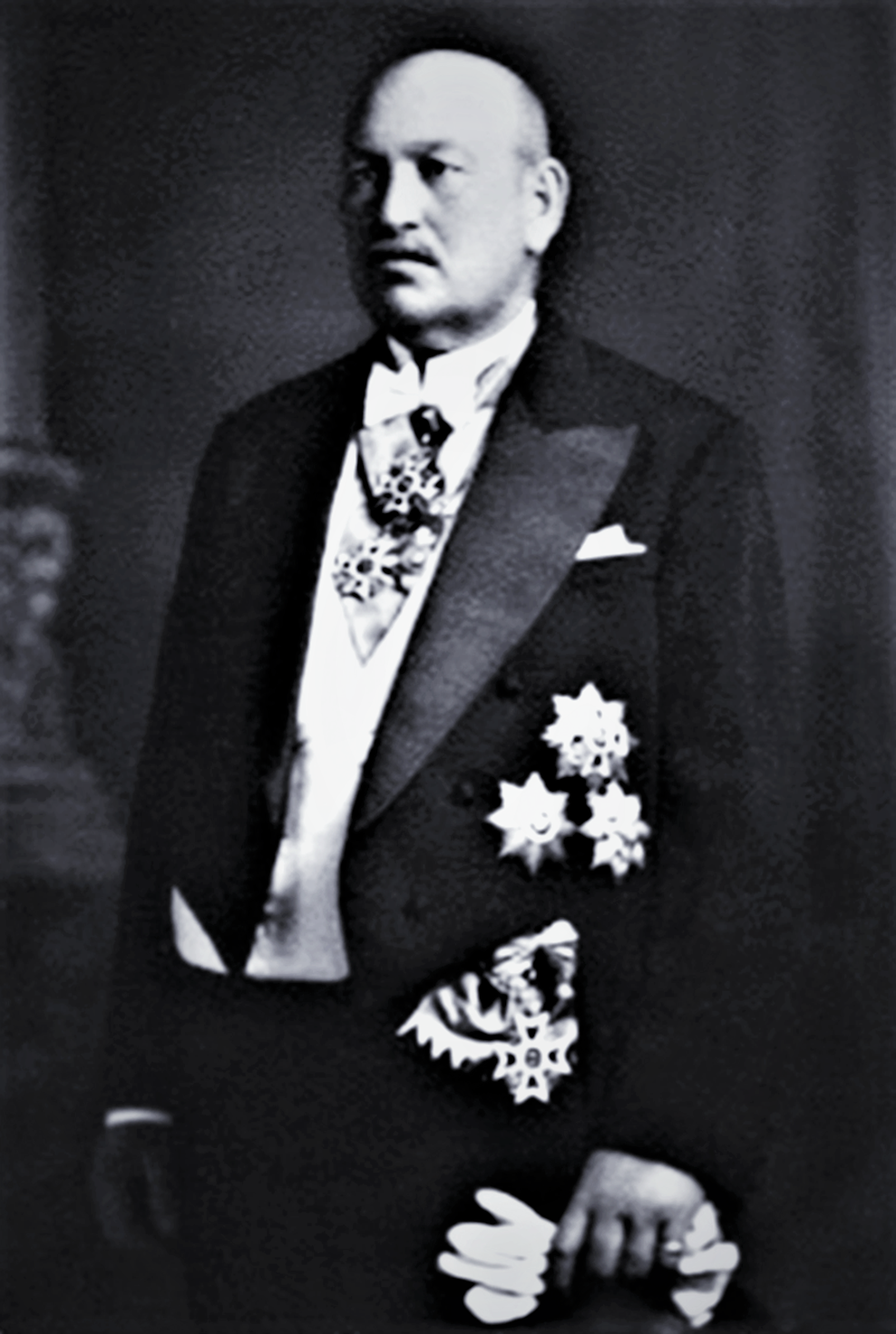
Papp in 1941

In 1922, he was present at the coronation of King Ferdinand. On 31 March 1923, he was promoted to the rank of Major General (General de divizie) by the King, being assigned to the I Army Corps from Craiova, then transferred to the VI Army Corps from Cluj in 1924.

In 1930 he moved to reserve service, and he retired from the military in 1934. After the administrative law promulgated by King Carol in 1938, he became Governor of Mureș County with his residence in Alba Iulia. Here he became actively involved in the development of the city and helped organize the National Museum of the Union.

As he was Greek-Catholic, he served as ambassador to the Holy See between 1941 and 1944. After the communist takeover of Romania, he was declared an "enemy of the people" and deprived of his rights, being removed from the pension registers, and thrown out of his living quarters. The communists eventually revoked their decision of canceling his pension, though some of his rights remained limited.

He spent the last of his days living in the basement room of one of his friend's house in Sibiu. He died on 30 March 1950 and was buried in Sibiu.

== Awards ==
=== Austria-Hungary ===
- Military Merit Medal
- Military Merit Cross
- Order of the Iron Crown, 3rd and 2nd class
- Order of Leopold

=== Germany ===
- Iron Cross 2nd class

=== Romania ===
- Grand Cross of the Order of the Crown of Romania
- Order of the Star of Romania

== Bibliography ==
- Curelea, Dragoș-Lucian (2021). "Contribuții la cunoașterea activității ofițerului român Dănilă Papp în serviciul militar al Austro-Ungariei (1890-1918)". Analele Liceului "Vasile Conta" Târgu-Neamț (in Romanian) (2/2021). Liceul "Vasile Conta".
