= Hungarian–Romanian War =

War fought from 1918 to 1919

- Part of the revolutions and interventions in Hungary
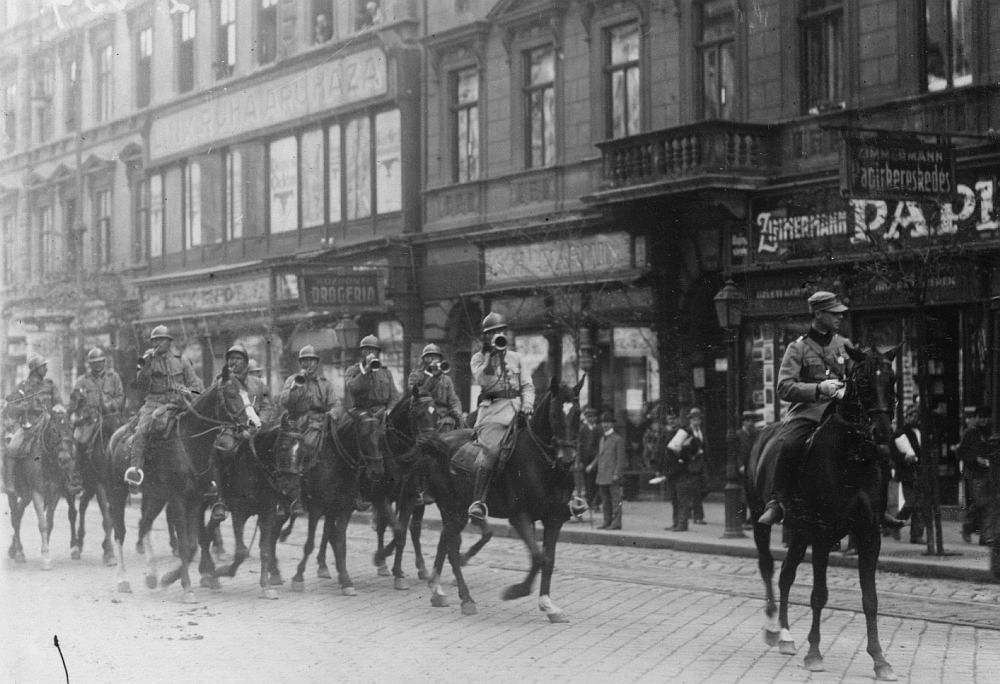
- Romanian cavalry in Budapest, August 1919
| Date | 13 November 1918 – 3 August 1919 (8 months and 3 weeks) |
| Location | Hungary |
| Result | Romanian victory |

Belligerents
| Kingdom of Hungary (13 November 1918 – 16 November 1918); Hungarian Republic (16 November 1918 – 21 March 1919); Soviet Hungary (21 March 1919 – 1 August 1919); Supported by: Soviet Russia | Romania; Supported by: France |

Commanders and leaders
| Mihály Károlyi; Béla Kun; Aurél Stromfeld; Vilmos Böhm; Tibor Szamuely; Ferenc Julier; V. Antonov-Ovseyenko | Ferdinand I; Prince Carol; Traian Moșoiu; Gheorghe Mărdărescu; Constantin Prezan; Marcel Olteanu; Ion Antonescu; Henri Berthelot |

Strength
| 10,000–80,000 | 10,000–96,000 |

Casualties and losses
| 11,666; 3,670 combat deaths; 6,000 killed in total; 40,000 captured | 3,000; 3,000 killed |

The Hungarian–Romanian War (Hungarian: magyar–román háború; Romanian: războiul româno-ungar) was fought between Hungary and Romania from 13 November 1918 to 3 August 1919. The conflict had a complex background, with often contradictory motivations for the parties involved.

Compared with the vast mobilizations of the First World War, both sides fielded remarkably small armies, and the proportion of deaths remained extraordinarily low throughout the fighting: During the entire nine-month campaign cost the Romanians just 3,670 killed, meanwhile Hungarian KIA is widely estimated between 2.000 to 6.000 soldiers.

After the unilateral self-disarmament of the Hungarian army by the pacifist Hungarian prime minister Count Mihály Károlyi, the Allies of World War I intended that Romania's Army, the Czechoslovak army and the Franco-Serbian armies to occupy various parts of Kingdom of Hungary. At the same time, there was a reluctance to allow Romania to occupy Hungary fully, although their intention was to, at least in part, satisfy the Romanian claims in accordance with the Treaty of Bucharest (1916) which proposed that Hungary cede Transylvania, Partium and parts of Banat to Romania. The situation was further complicated by the strained relationship between the Romanian delegation at the Paris Peace Conference and the Great Powers. France, in particular, was keen on the participation of Romania in the intervention against the Bolshevik forces in Russia while the Romanian authorities conditioned this involvement on the fulfillment of the promises made by the Allies in 1916. Some Allied leaders in Paris supported the advance of the Romanian Army while the Council of Four withheld its approval of the military actions. The French General Staff encouraged a continued Romanian advance to Budapest, with Generals Ferdinand Foch, Louis Franchet d'Espèrey, and Henri Mathias Berthelot particularly in favor of this approach.

In Transylvania there were political and ethnic tensions between various Romanian, Hungarian, Saxon, and other ethnic groups. However, Romania's motivations to enter the neutral zone and cross the demarcation lines were not limited only to protecting the ethnic Romanians, but also to occupy the territory in accordance with the 1916 agreement, thus presenting the Allies with a fait accompli.

In the aftermath of World War I and the proclamation of the independence of Hungary from the Dual Monarchy, the Hungarians tried to convince the Allies that "Hungary should not be penalized too harshly for the sins of the old". Despite the Hungarian government offering concessions to the ethnic minorities, it was "too little, too late". The political leaders of ethnic Romanians, as well as Serbs, Slovaks, Croats, and other minorities, had already decided to secede. Moreover, the decision of the Council of Four to establish a neutral zone that largely reflected the treaty between Romania and the Allies in 1916 contributed to the liberal president Count Mihály Károlyi's resignation and the subsequent creation of the Hungarian Soviet Republic. The threat of Béla Kun's Hungarian Red Army and Red Guards linking up with other Bolshevik forces was decisive in the joint decision of several Allied representatives and the Romanian authorities to "settle the Hungarian question immediately".

== Background ==
Béla Linder's speech for military officers, and declaration of Hungarian self-disarmament on 2 November 1918.

Protest of the Transylvanian National Council on the intervention of Romania into Transylvania on 22 December 1918

=== Postwar Hungary ===
==== Aster Revolution, liberal republic and self-disarmament of Hungary ====
In 1918, Austria-Hungary collapsed politically and disintegrated as a result of its defeat on the Italian Front. During the war, the liberal Hungarian aristocrat Count Mihály Károlyi had led a small but very active pacifist antiwar maverick faction in the Hungarian Parliament. He had even organised covert contacts with British and French diplomats in Switzerland during the war. On 31 October 1918, the Aster Revolution in Budapest brought to power Károlyi, a supporter of the Allies. The Hungarian Royal Honvéd army still consisted of 1,400,000 soldiers, who had been recruited from the territory of Kingdom of Hungary when Mihály Károlyi was announced as Hungarian prime minister. Károlyi yielded to US President Woodrow Wilson's demand for pacifism by ordering the disarmament of the Hungarian Army, which happened under the direction of War Minister Béla Linder on 2 November 1918. The unilateral disarmament of its army made Hungary remain without national defence. Thus it became particularly vulnerable. Oszkár Jászi, the new Minister for National Minorities of Hungary, offered referendums on the disputed borders for minorities (such as the Romanians in Transylvania), but the political leaders of those minorities refused the very idea of referendums regarding disputed territories at the Paris Peace Conference.

==== International reactions after Hungarian unilateral disarmament ====
Six days later, on 5 November 1918, the Serbian Army, with the help of the French Army, crossed the southern border of the Kingdom of Hungary. On 8 November, the Czechoslovak Army crossed the northern border, and on 13 November, the Romanian Army crossed the eastern border. That day, Károlyi signed an armistice with the Allies in Belgrade, which limited the size of the Hungarian Army to six infantry and two cavalry divisions. Demarcation lines defining the territory to remain under Hungarian control were made.

The lines would apply until definitive borders could be established. Under the terms of the armistice, Serbian and French troops advanced from the south and took control of the Banat and Croatia. Czechoslovakia took control of Upper Hungary (today mostly Slovakia) and Carpathian Ruthenia. Romanian forces were permitted to advance to the Mureș River. However, on 14 November, Serbia occupied Pécs. The Hungarian unilateral disarmament made the occupation of Hungary possible for the relatively small Romanian Army, Franco-Serbian army and the armed forces of the newly-established Czechoslovakia. During the rule of Károlyi's pacifist cabinet, Hungary lost control of approximately 75% of its former prewar territories (325,411 km^{2} (125,642 sq mi) .

=== Romania during the First World War ===
Proclamation of King Ferdinand I of Romania to the Romanian People, 28 August 1916:
"In our moral energy and our valour lie the means of giving him back his birthright of a great and free Rumania from the Tisza to the Black Sea, and to prosper in peace in accordance with our customs and our hopes and dreams."

On August 27, 1916, the Kingdom of Romania declared war against Austria-Hungary and entered the First World War on the side of the Allies. In doing so, Romania's goal was to unite all the territories in which a Romanian population existed in a single state. In the Treaty of Bucharest of August 17, 1916, terms for Romania's acquisition of territories in Austria-Hungary were stipulated. However, in military and geopolitical sense, the key factor in Romania's entry into the war was the successes of the Russian Brusilov offensive against Austria-Hungary. After a short Romanian initial success, the campaign turned into a military disaster for Romania. After three months of war, two thirds of the territory of the Kingdom of Romania were occupied by the Central Powers. Bucharest, the capital city of Romania, was captured by the Central Powers on 6 December 1916. German General August von Mackensen was appointed as the "military governor" of the occupied territories of Romania. Following Russia's ceasefire agreements, the Romanian army was forced to sign the Armistice of Focșani on 9 December 1917.

In 1918, after the October Revolution, the Bolsheviks signed a separate peace with the Central Powers in the Treaty of Brest-Litovsk. Romania was alone on the Eastern Front, a situation that far surpassed its military capabilities. Therefore, on 7 May 1918, Romania sued for peace. Romanian Prime Minister Alexandru Marghiloman signed the Treaty of Bucharest (1918) with the Central Powers, but the treaty was never signed by King Ferdinand I of Romania.

At the end of 1918, Romania's situation was dire. It was suffering from the consequences of punitive war reparations. Dobruja was under Bulgarian occupation. The bulk of the Romanian Army was demobilised and had only four full-strength divisions. A further eight divisions were left in a reserve status. Only the 9th and 10th infantry divisions and the 1st and 2nd cavalry divisions were at full strength. However, those units were engaged in the protection of Bessarabia against Soviet Russia.

On 11 November 1918, Germany signed an armistice with Allies under which they had to immediately withdraw all German troops in Romania and in the Ottoman Empire, the Austro-Hungarian Empire and the Russian Empire back to German territory. The Allies were to have access to those countries. After the German armistice, the units of the German Army, under the command of Marshal August von Mackensen, were ordered to retreat to Germany.

== November 1918 – March 1919 ==
On 10 November 1918, less than 24 hrs. before the war's end, Romania re-entered the war on the side of the Allied forces, with similar objectives to those of 1916. King Ferdinand called for the mobilisation of the Romanian Army and ordered it to attack by crossing the Carpathian Mountains into Transylvania. The 1st Vânători and the 7th and 8th Infantry divisions, stationed in Moldavia, were the first units to be mobilised. The 8th was sent to Bukovina and the other two were sent to Transylvania. On 13 November, the 7th entered Transylvania at the Prisăcani River in the Eastern Carpathians. The 1st then entered Transylvania at Palanca, Bacău.

On 1 December, the desire of the Union of "Transylvania, Banat and the Hungarian Lands" with Romania was declared by the 1,228 elected representatives of the Romanian people of Transylvania, Banat, Crișana and Maramureș, who proclaimed the union with Romania. Later, the Transylvanian Saxons and Banat Swabians also supported the union. On 7 December, Brașov was occupied by the Romanian Army. Later that month, Romanian units reached the line of the Mureș River, a demarcation line that had been agreed upon by the representatives of the Allies and Hungary at the Armistice of Belgrade.

Following a request from Romania, the Allied Command in the east, led by French General Louis Franchet d'Espèrey, allowed the Romanian Army to advance to the line of the western Carpathians. The 7th Infantry division advanced toward Cluj, and the 1st division advanced in toward Alba Iulia. On 24 December, units of the Romanian Army entered Cluj-Napoca. By 22 January 1919, the Romanian army controlled all the territory to the Mureș River. The 7th and 1st divisions were spread thinly and so the 2nd Division was sent to Sibiu and the 6th Division to Brașov. Two new infantry divisions, the 16th and 18th, were formed from soldiers previously mobilised in the Austro-Hungarian Army. A unified command of the Romanian Army in Transylvania was established. Its headquarters were at Sibiu, with General Traian Moșoiu in command. Although Romania controlled new territories, it did not encompass all ethnic Romanians in the region.

On 28 February 1919, at the Paris Peace Conference, the Allies notified Hungary of a new demarcation line to which the Romanian army would advance. The line coincided with railways connecting Satu Mare, Oradea, and Arad. However, the Romanian Army was not to enter those cities. A demilitarised zone was to be created extending from the new demarcation line to 5 kilometres (3.1 mi) beyond the line. The demilitarised zone represented the extent of Romanian territorial requests on Hungary. The retreat of the Hungarian Army behind the western border of the demilitarised zone was to begin on 22 March.

On 19 March, Hungary received notification of the new demarcation line and demilitaritarised zone from French Lieutenant Colonel Fernand Vix (the "Vix Note"). The Károlyi government would not accept the terms, which was a trigger for the coup d'état by Béla Kun, who formed the Hungarian Soviet Republic. Meanwhile, limited sporadic skirmishes took place between Romanian army and small local Hungarian civil insurgent groups. Some Hungarian elements engaged in the harassing the Romanians outside the area controlled by the Romanian Army.

== Interventions, fall of liberal regime and communist coup ==
Regional situation, 1918–1920

The pacifist Károlyi government failed to manage domestic and military issues and lost popular support. On 20 March 1919, Béla Kun, who had been imprisoned in the Markó Street prison, was released. On 21 March, he led a successful communist coup d'état. President Károlyi was deposed and arrested by the new government. Kun formed a social democratic communist coalition government and proclaimed the Hungarian Soviet Republic. Days later, the communists purged the Social Democrats from the government. The Hungarian Soviet Republic was a small communist rump state. When the Republic of Councils in Hungary was established, it controlled only approximately 23% of the Hungary's historic territory.

The communists remained bitterly unpopular in the Hungarian countryside, where the authority of that government was often nonexistent. The communist had real popular support only among the proletarian masses of large industrial centres, especially in Budapest, where the working class represented a high proportion of the population. The communist government followed the soviet model. The party established its terror groups (like the infamous Lenin Boys) to "overcome the obstacles" in the Hungarian countryside, which was later known as the Red Terror in Hungary.

The new government promised equality and social justice. It proposed that Hungary be restructured as a federation. The proposal was designed to appeal to both domestic and foreign opinion. Domestic considerations included maintaining the territorial integrity and economic unity of former crown lands and protecting the nation's borders. The government had popular support in the cities and the support of the army. Most of the officers in the Hungarian Army came from regions that had been forcibly occupied during the First World War, which heightened their patriotic mood. Hungary as a federation would appeal to Wilson under his doctrine of self-determination of peoples because of the nation's multiethnic composition. In addition, self-governed and self-directed institutions for the non-Magyar peoples of Hungary would lessen the dominance of the Magyar people.

== April–June 1919 ==
After 21 March 1919, Romania found itself between two nations with communist governments: Hungary to the west and Soviet Russia to the east. The Romanian delegation at the Paris Peace Conference asked the Romanian Army to be allowed to oust Kun's communist government in Hungary. The Allies were aware of the communist danger to Romania. However, there was a climate of dissension in the council among United States President Woodrow Wilson, British Prime Minister David Lloyd George, and French Prime Minister Georges Clemenceau about guarantees required by France on its borders with Germany. In particular, the American delegation was convinced that French hardliners around Marshal Ferdinand Foch were trying to initiate a new conflict with Germany and Soviet Russia. The Allied council tried to defuse the situation between Romania and Hungary.

On 4 April, South African General Jan Smuts was sent to Hungary and discussed with the Hungarian communist government a proposition that they abide by the conditions previously presented to Károlyi in the Vix Note. Smuts's mission also represented official recognition of the Kun government by the Allies. He may have asked if Kun would act as a conduit for communication between the Allies and the Soviet Russians. In exchange for Hungary's agreement to the conditions set out in the Vix Note, the Allies promised to lift the blockade of Hungary and to take a benevolent attitude towards Hungary's loss of territory to Romania, Czechoslovakia and Yugoslavia. Kun refused the terms and demanded the Romanian forces return to the line of the Maros (Mureș) River. Smuts' negotiations ceased.

Kun stalled for time to build a force capable of fighting Romania and Czechoslovakia. Hungary had 20,000 troops facing the Romanian Army and mobilised a further 60,000. There were recruitment centres in towns such as Nagyvárad, Gyula, Debrecen and Szolnok. There were some elite units and officers from the former Austro-Hungarian Army, but some were volunteers with little training. The Hungarian troops were equipped with 137 cannons and five armoured trains and were motivated by sentiments of Hungarian nationalism, rather than communist ideals. Kun hoped that Soviet Russia would attack Romania from the east.

When Kun declined the terms of the Vix Note, Romania acted to enforce the new railway demarcation line. The Romanian Army in Transylvania included 64 infantry battalions, 28 cavalry squadrons, 160 cannons, 32 howitzers, one armoured train, three air squadrons and two pioneer battalions, one north and one south. General Gheorghe Mărdărescu commanded the Romanian Army in Transylvania. The commander of the north battalion was General Moșoiu. Romania planned to take offensive action on 16 April 1919. The north battalion was to take Nagykároly (Carei) and Nagyvárad (Oradea), which would separate the elite Hungarian Székely Division from the rest of the Hungarian Army. The north battalion would then outflank the Hungarian Army. Simultaneously, the south battalion would advance to Máriaradna (now part of Lipova) and Belényes (Beiuș).

== Hostilities begin ==
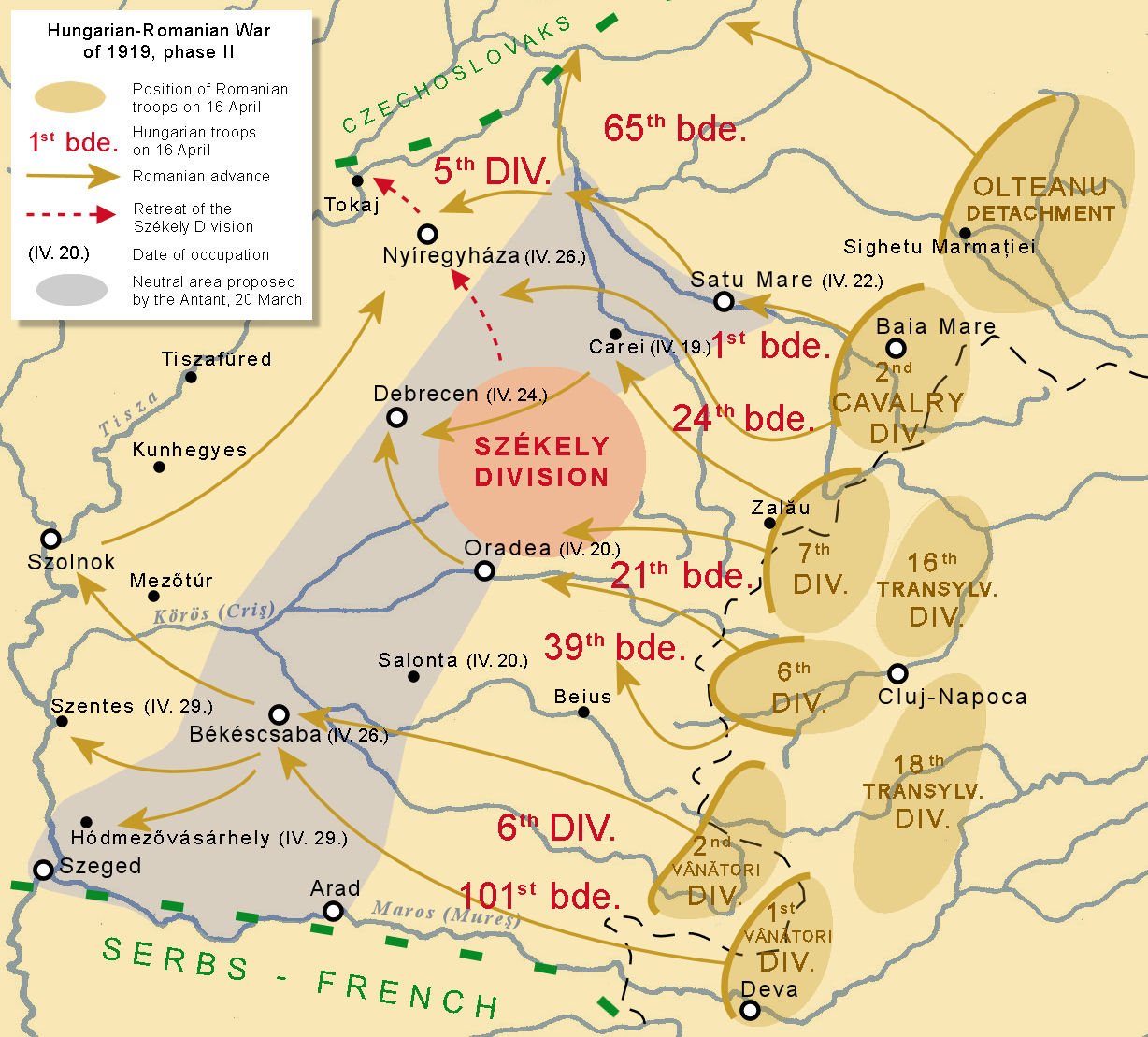
Romanian Army operations in April 1919

When Kun became aware of Romanian preparations for an offensive, he fortified mountain passes in the territory controlled by the Hungarian Red Army. Then, on the night of 15–16 April, the Hungarians launched a pre-emptive attack, but the Romanian lines held. On 16 April, the Romanian Army commenced its offensive. After heavy fighting, the Romanians took the mountain passes. On the front of the 2nd Vânători Division, a battalion of Hungarian cadets offered strong resistance; however, they were defeated by the 9th Regiment.

By 18 April, the first elements of the Romanian offensive had been completed, and the Hungarian front had been broken. On 19 April, Romanian forces took Carei (Nagykároly), and on 20 April, they took Oradea (Nagyvárad) and Salonta (Nagyszalonta). Rather than following the instructions of the Vix Note, the Romanian Army pressed on for the Tisza River, an easily defended natural military obstacle.

=== The Romanian Army reaches the Tisza River ===
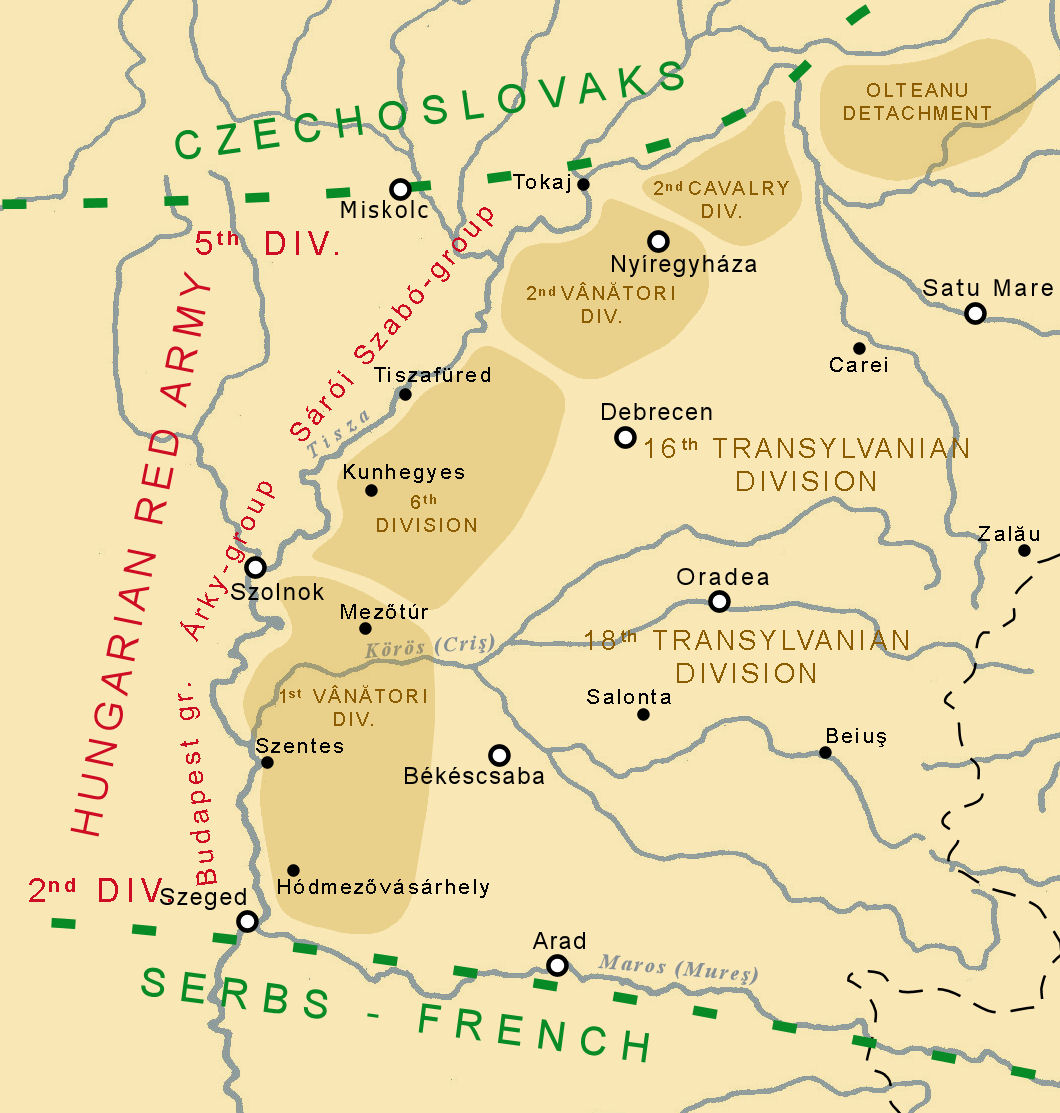
Front lines on 3 May 1919

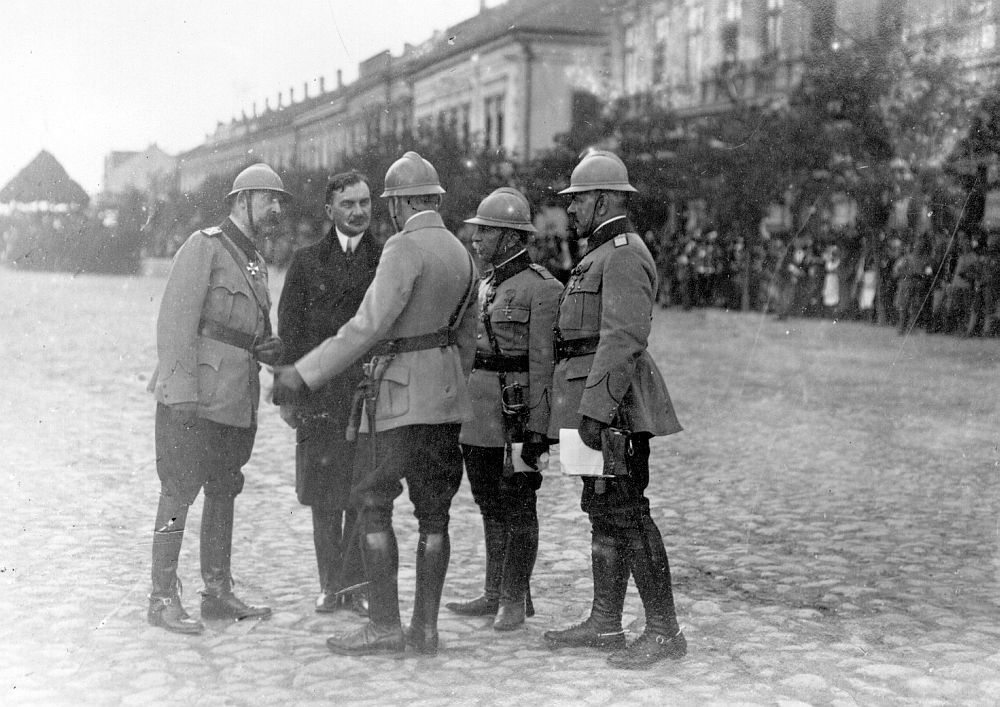
King Ferdinand I with Iuliu Maniu and generals Constantin Prezan, Gheorghe Mărdărescu, and Ștefan Panaitescu at Békéscsaba, 24 May 1919

On 23 April, Debrecen was occupied by Romanian forces. The Romanian Army then began preparations for an assault on Békéscsaba. On 25–26 April, after some heavy fighting, Békéscsaba fell to Romanian forces. The Hungarians retreated to Szolnok and, from there, across the Tisza River. They established two concentric defense lines extending from the Tisza River around Szolnok. Between 29 April and 1 May, the Romanian Army broke through the lines. On the evening of 1 May, the entire east bank of the Tisza River was under the control of the Romanian Army.

On 30 April, French Foreign Minister Stéphen Pichon summoned Ion I.C. Brătianu, the Romanian representative to the Paris Peace Conference. Romania was told to cease its advance at the Tisza River and to retreat to the first demarcation line imposed by the Allied council. Brătianu promised that the Romanian troops would not cross the Tisza River. On 2 May, Hungary sued for peace by a request delivered by its representative, Lieutenant Colonel Henrik Werth. Kun was prepared to recognise all of Romania's territorial demands, request the cessation of hostilities and ask for ongoing control of Hungarian internal affairs.

Romania offered an armistice but gave it only under pressure from the Allies. General Moșoiu became the governor of the military district between the Romanian border and the Tisza River. General Mihăescu became commander of the north battalion. The 7th Division was moved to the Russian front in Moldavia. On 24 May, King Ferdinand I of Romania and Iuliu Maniu (the head of Transylvania's Directory Council) visited the frontline area and met with generals Constantin Prezan, Gheorghe Mărdărescu, and Ștefan Panaitescu at Békéscsaba.

=== Foreign policy scandal: establishment of Slovak Soviet Republic ===
In late May, after the Entente military representative demanded more territorial concessions from Hungary, Kun attempted to "fulfill" his promise to adhere to Hungary's historic borders. Kun ordered the preparation of an offensive against Czechoslovakia, which would increase his domestic support by making good on his promise to "restore" Hungary's borders. The men of the Hungarian Red Army were recruited mainly from the volunteers of the Budapest proletariat.

In June, the Hungarian Red Army invaded the eastern part of the newly forming Czechoslovakia: Slovakia and Carpathian Ruthenia (approximately the former Upper Hungary). The Hungarian Red Army achieved some early military success. Under the leadership of Colonel Aurél Stromfeld, it ousted Czechoslovak troops from the north and planned to march against the Romanian Army in the east. The Hungarian Red Army recruited men between 19 and 25 years old. Industrial workers from Budapest volunteered. Many former Austro-Hungarian officers re-enlisted for patriotic reasons. The Hungarian Red Army moved its 1st and 5th artillery divisions (40 battalions) northwards to Czechoslovakia.

On 20 May 1919, a force under Colonel Aurél Stromfeld attacked and routed Czechoslovak troops from Miskolc. The Romanian Army attacked the Hungarian flank with troops from the 16th Infantry Division and the Second Vânători Division and aimed to maintain contact with the Czechoslovak Army. Hungarian troops prevailed and the Romanian Army retreated to its bridgehead at Tokaj. There, between 25 and 30 May, Romanian forces were required to defend their position against Hungarian attacks.

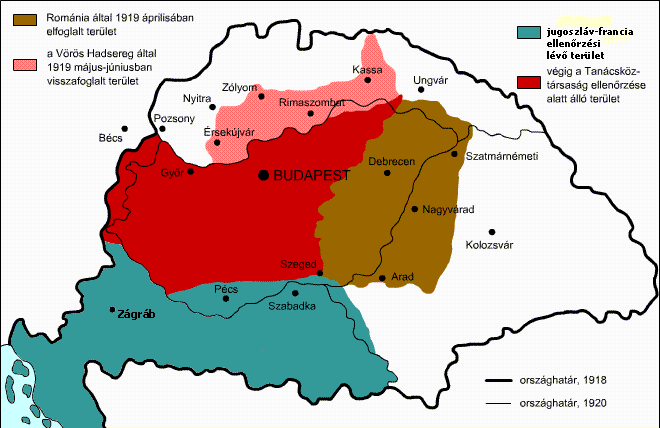
Borders in 1918 Borders in 1919, 1920 Occupied by Romania in April 1919 Controlled by the Hungarian Soviet Republic Recovered by the Hungarian Soviet Republic Under French and Yugoslav control

On 3 June, the Romanian Army was forced into further retreat but extended its line of defence along the Tisza River and reinforced its position with the 8th Division, which had been moving forward from Bukovina since 22 May. Hungary at the time controlled the territory from its old borders and had regained control of industrial areas around Miskolc, Salgótarján, Banská Štiavnica (Selmecbánya), and Košice (Kassa).

==== Demoralisation of the Red Army ====
Despite promises for the restoration of the former borders of Hungary, after the military successes the communists immediately declared the establishment of the Slovak Soviet Republic in Prešov (Eperjes) on 16 June 1919. After the proclamation of the Slovak Soviet Republic, the Hungarian nationalists and patriots soon realised that the new communist government had no intention to recapture the lost territories but only to spread communist ideology and establish other communist states in Europe, thus sacrificing Hungarian national interests.

The Hungarian patriots and the professional military officers in the Red Army saw the establishment of the Slovak Soviet Republic as a betrayal, and their support for the government began to erode (the communists and their government supported the establishment of a Slovak communist state, while the Hungarian patriots wanted to keep the reoccupied territories for Hungary). Despite a series of military victories against the Czechoslovak Army, the Hungarian Red Army started to disintegrate because of tensions between nationalists and communists during the establishment of the Slovak Soviet Republic. The concession eroded the support of the communist government by professional military officers and nationalists in the Hungarian Red Army. Even the chief of general staff, Aurél Stromfeld, resigned his post in protest.

When the French promised the Hungarian government that Romanian forces would withdraw from the Tiszántúl, Kun withdrew from Czechoslovakia his remaining military units that had remained loyal after the political fiasco with the Slovak Soviet Republic. Kun then unsuccessfully tried to turn the remaining units of the demoralized Hungarian Red Army on the Romanians.

=== Anti-communist conflicts with Soviet Russia ===
The Union of Bessarabia with Romania was signed on 9 April 1918. It brought these lands within the modern Romanian state was not recognised by Soviet Russia, which was however, occupied in fighting the White movement, Poland, and Ukraine in its war for independence and so resources were not available to challenge Romania. The Bolshevik Soviet Russians might have used the Ukrainian paramilitary leader Nykyfor Hryhoriv to challenge Romania, but circumstances for that plan did not prove to be favourable.

Prior to communist rule in Hungary, Soviet Russia had engaged the Odessa Soviet Republic to invade Romania and make sporadic attacks across the Dniester River to reclaim territory from the Bessarabia Governorate. The Moldavian Autonomous Soviet Socialist Republic, established in 1924, was later used the same way. Romania successfully repelled both incursions. After the commencement of communist rule in Hungary, Soviet Russia pressured Romania with ultimatums and threats of war. Although a Romanian army division and some other newly formed units were moved from the Hungarian front to Bessarabia, those threats did not deter Romania's actions in Hungary.

On 9 February 1918, the Central Powers and Ukraine signed the Treaty of Brest-Litovsk, which recognised Ukraine as a neutral and independent state. Incursions into Romanian territory ceased. From January–May 1919, there were some further limited actions by Soviet forces against Romania. In late January, the Ukrainian Army, under Bolshevik command, moved towards Zbruch. Ukrainian forces took Khotyn, a town that had been occupied by Romania since 10 November 1918. Ukrainian forces held Khotyn for a few days before they were routed by the Romanian Army.

Soviet Russia was then fending off attacks by the Armed Forces of South Russia led by Anton Denikin. Three French and two Greek army divisions under General Philippe Henri Joseph d'Anselme with support from Polish, Ukrainian, and Russian volunteers, attacked Soviet troops near Odessa. On 21 March 1919, in support of the allied attack, Romanian troops of the 39th Regiment occupied Tiraspol.

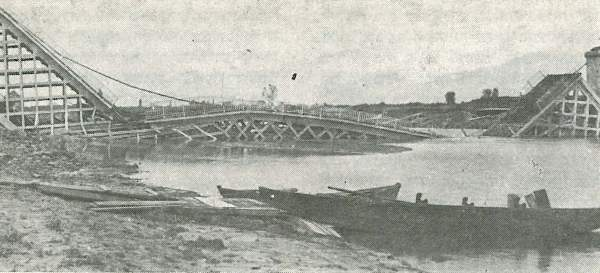
Former Bender railway bridge after its destruction by Romanian troops in 1919

In April, at Berzov, the Bolshevik Soviet Ukrainian 3rd Army defeated d'Anselme's forces, which retreated towards Odessa. In late April, a change in government in France led to withdrawal of the Allied forces from Odessa. The troops left by ship and abandoned some heavy equipment. Some troops, with Ukrainian and Russian volunteers, retreated through southern Bessarabia. Meanwhile, the Romanian Army fortified its positions in Bessarabia.

On 1 May, Bolshevik Soviet Russian Foreign Minister Georgy Chicherin issued an ultimatum to the Romanian government to leave Bessarabia. Under the command of Vladimir Antonov-Ovseyenko, Bolshevik Soviet Russian troops gathered along the Dniester River in preparation for a large attack on Bessarabia on 10 May. The attacks in Bessarabia intensified and peaked on 27–28 May with an uprising in Tighina. In preparation for this attack, they threw manifestos from a plane, inviting Allied troops to fraternise with them. Sixty French soldiers crossed the Dniester River to support the Russians. The Bolshevik Soviet Russian forces entered Tighina and held the town for a number of hours.

The Romanian Army's 4th and 5th infantry divisions were moved to Bessarabia. In southern Bessarabia a territorial command unit formed by the Romanian Army's 15th Infantry Division was established. By the end of June, tensions in the area had eased.

== July 1919 – August 1919 ==
The Allies were deeply displeased by the Romanian advance to the Tisza River. The Allies asked Romania to retreat to the first railway demarcation line and to commence negotiations with the Kun government. Romania persisted at the Tisza Line. The Allies pressured Hungary to stop its incursions into Czechoslovakia by threatening a co-ordinated action against Hungary by French, Serb and Romanian forces from the south and the east. However, the Allies also promised favour to Hungary in subsequent peace negotiations in delineating Hungary's new borders. On 12 June, the council discussed Hungary's proposed new borders with Romania, Czechoslovakia and Yugoslavia.

On 23 June, Hungary signed an armistice with Czechoslovakia. By 4 July, the Hungarian Army had retreated 15 km south of the Hungarian–Czechoslovak demarcation line. The council demanded Romania leave Tiszántúl and to respect the new borders. Romania said it would not do so until the Hungarian Army had demobilised. Kun said that he would continue to depend on the might of his army. On 11 July, the council ordered Marshal Ferdinand Foch to prepare a co-ordinated attack against Hungary by using Serb, French and Romanian forces. Hungary, in turn, prepared for action along the Tisza River.

The Romanian Army faced the Hungarian army along the Tisza River front line over a distance of 250 kilometres (160 mi). The front extended from beyond Szeged in the south, adjacent to French and Serb troops, to Tokaj, in the north, adjacent to Czechoslovak troops. On 17 July, Hungary attacked.

=== Hungarian Army in July 1919 ===
Bela Kun's Red Army was led by political commissars because the experienced professional military officers resigned after the political fiasco during the Hungarian-Czechoslovak war. Their commanders of small units were however experienced soldiers. The Hungarian Army mustered 100 infantry battalions (50,000 men), ten cavalry squadrons (1,365 men), 69 artillery batteries of calibers up to 305 mm, and nine armoured trains. The troops were organized into three groups: north, central, and south. The central group was the strongest.

Hungary planned to cross the Tisza River with all three groups. The north group would advance towards Satu Mare (Szatmárnémeti), the central group to Oradea (Nagyvárad), and the south group to Arad. Their aim was to incite Bolshevik Soviet Russia to attack Bessarabia.

=== Romanian Army in July 1919 ===
The Romanian Army was composed of 92 battalions (48,000 men), 58 cavalry squadrons (12,000 men), 80 artillery batteries of calibers up to 155 mm, two armoured trains and some support units. They were positioned along three lines. The first line was manned by the 16th Division in the north and the 18th Division in the south. More powerful units manned the second line: the 2nd Vânători Division in the north, concentrated in and around Nyíregyháza, and the 1st Vânători Division in the south, concentrated in and around Békéscsaba.

The third line was manned by Romania's strongest units: the 1st and 6th infantry divisions, the 1st and 2nd cavalry divisions and support units. It lay on the railway from Carei, through Oradea and north of Arad. The 20th and 21st infantry divisions were tasked with maintaining public order behind the third line. The first line was thin, as it was supposed to fight delaying actions until the true intentions of the attacking Hungarian Army were revealed. Then, together with troops in the second line, the first line was to be held until troops in the third line could mount a counterattack. The Romanian command planned to use the railways under its control to move troops. Most Romanian soldiers were First World War veterans.

=== Hungarian offensive ===
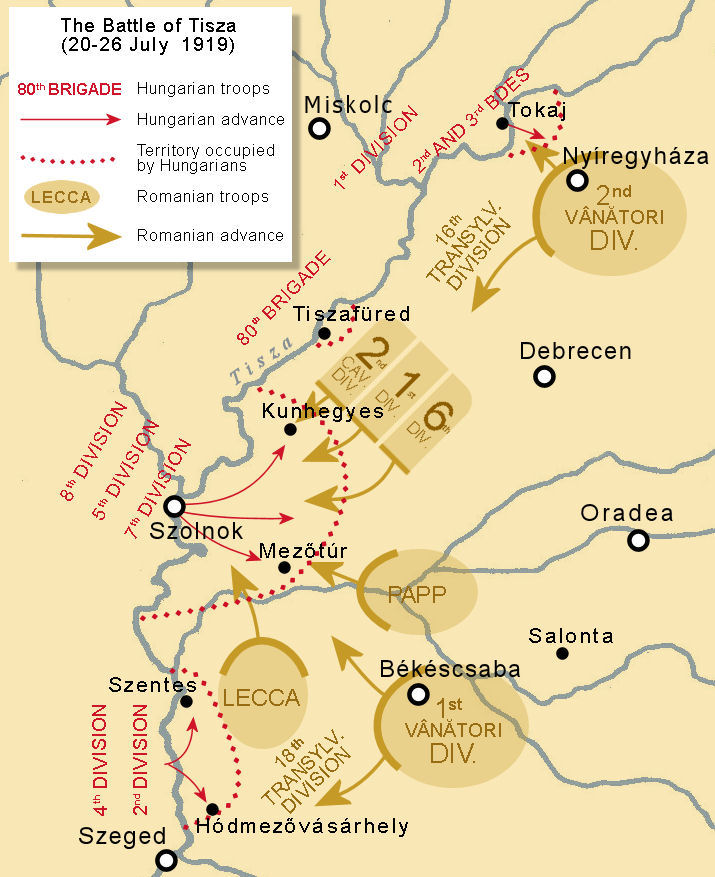
Operations of the Hungarian and Romanian armies during the battle of the Tisza River in July 1919.

From 17 to 20 July, the Hungarian army bombarded the Romanian positions and conducted reconnaissance operations. On 20 July, at about 3 a.m., after a fierce bombardment, Hungarian infantry including all three groups crossed the Tisza River and attacked Romanian positions. On 20 July, in the northern arena, the Hungarians army took Rakamaz and some nearby villages. Troops of the Romanian 16th and 2nd Vânători divisions took back the villages shortly and regained Rakamaz the next day. The Hungarians renewed their efforts and, supported by artillery fire, retook Rakamaz and two nearby villages but could not break out of the Rakamaz bridgehead.

Hungarian forces attempted to outflank the Romanian positions by crossing the Tisza River at Tiszafüred with troops of the 80th International Brigade. There, they were halted by troops of the Romanian 16th Division. On 24 July, the Romanian 20th Infantry Division, brought in as reinforcements, cleared the bridgehead at Tiszafüred. Not being able to break out of Rakamaz, Hungarian forces fortified their positions and redeployed some troops. There was a lull in fighting in the north, as the Romanian troops did the same. On 26 July, the Romanians attacked, and by 10 p.m. had cleared the Rakamaz bridgehead, which left the Romanian army in control of the northern part of the Tisza's eastern bank.

In the southern area, during a two-day battle, the Hungarian 2nd Division took Szentes from the 89th and 90th regiments of the Romanian 18th Division. On 21–22 July, Hódmezővásárhely changed hands several times between Hungarian and Romanian troops of the 90th Infantry Regiment supported by the 1st Vânători Brigade. On 23 July, Romanian forces reoccupied Hódmezővásárhely, Szentes and Mindszent. The Romanians controlled the eastern bank of the Tisza River in that sector, which allowed the 1st Vânători Brigade to move to the centre. On 20 July, Hungarian forces established a solid bridgehead on the east bank of the Tisza at Szolnok, opposed by the Romanian 91st Regiment of the 18th Infantry Division. The Hungarian army moved the 6th and 7th divisions across the Tisza River, formed up within the bridgehead, and attacked the Romanians in the first line of defense. The Hungarian 6th Infantry Division took Törökszentmiklós, the 7th Division advanced towards Mezőtúr and the 5th Division advanced towards Túrkeve.

On 22 July, Hungarian forces crossed the Tisza River 20 kilometres (12 mi) north of Szolnok and took Kunhegyes from the Romanian 18th Vânători Regiment. The Romanian 18th Division was reinforced with units from the second line, including some troops from the 1st Cavalry Division and the entire 2nd Vânători Brigade. On 23 July, Hungarian forces took Túrkeve and Mezőtúr. The Hungarian Army controlled an area 80 kilometres (50 mi) long along the bank of the Tisza River and 60 kilometres (37 mi) deep to the east of the Tisza River at Szolnok. The Romanian Army undertook manoeuvres to the north of the Hungarian territory. General Cleante Davidoglu, commanding the 2nd Cavalry Division, formed closest to the river. General Mihail Obogeanu, commanding the 1st Infantry Division, formed in the centre and General Marcel Olteanu, commanding the 6th Infantry Division, formed furthest to the east.

=== Romanian counterattack ===
On 24 July, the Romanian Army's northern manoeuvre group attacked. Elements of the 2nd Cavalry Division, supported by troops of the 18th Infantry Division, took Kunhegyes. The Romanian 1st Infantry Division attacked the Hungarian 6th Infantry Division and took Fegyvernek. The Romanian 6th Division was less successful and was counterattacked on the left flank by the Hungarian reserve formations. Altogether, the attack pushed back the Hungarian Army 20 kilometres (12 mi). Romanian forces were supported by the 2nd Vânători Division and some cavalry units when they became available.

On 25 July, fighting continued. Hungarian forces counterattacked at Fegyvernek and engaged the Romanian 1st Infantry Division. With their lines breaking, Hungarian troops began a retreat towards the Tisza River bridge at Szolnok. On 26 July, Hungarian forces destroyed the bridge. By the end of the day, the east bank of the Tisza River was once again under Romanian control.

=== Romanian forces crossing the Tisza River ===
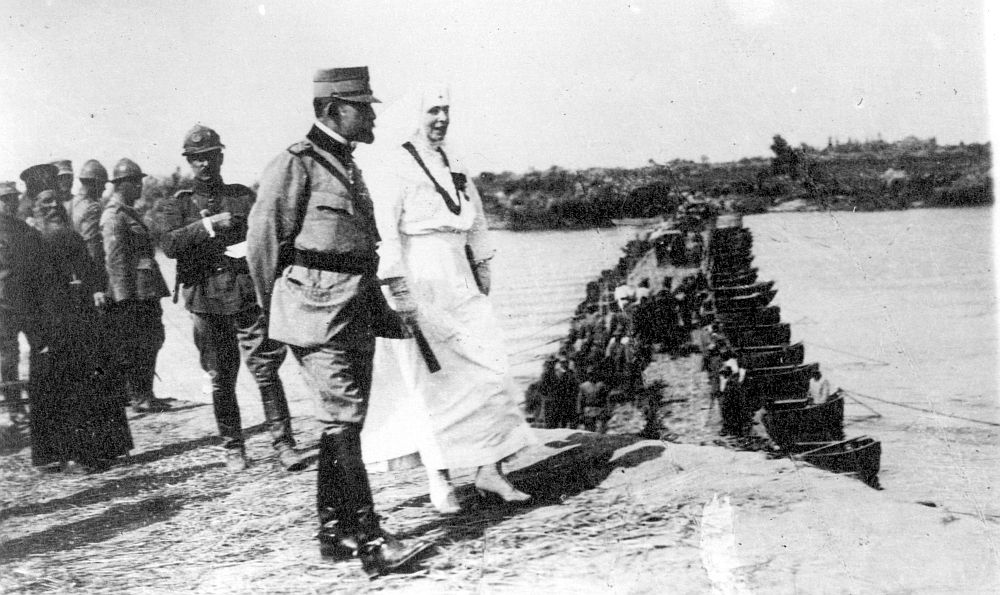
Troops from the 2nd Vânători Division crossing the Tisza River in the presence of King Ferdinand and Queen Marie.

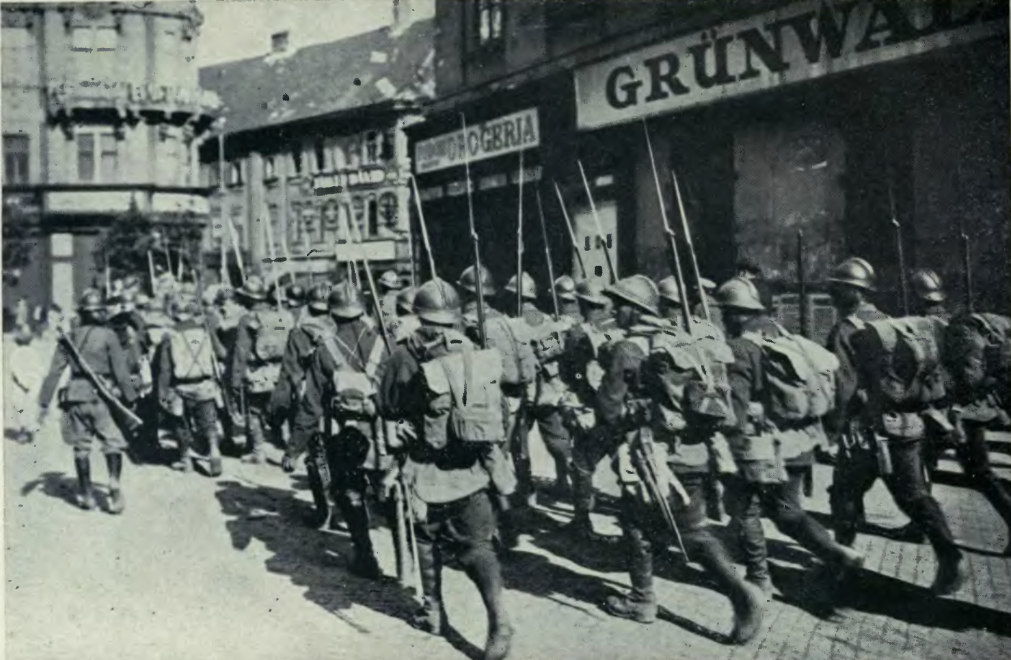
Romanian troops entering Budapest.

After repelling the Hungarian attack, the Romanian Army prepared to cross the Tisza River. The 7th Infantry Division returned from Bessarabia. The 2nd Infantry Division and some smaller infantry and artillery units also returned. The Romanian Army massed 119 battalions (84,000 men), 99 artillery batteries with 392 guns and 60 cavalry squadrons (12,000 men). Hungarian forces continued an artillery bombardment.

From 27 to 29 July, the Romanian Army tested the strength of the Hungarian defense by small attacks. A plan was made to cross the Tisza River near Fegyvernek, where it makes a turn. On the night of 29–30 July, the Romanian Army crossed the Tisza River. Decoy operations were mounted at other points along the river and brought intense artillery duels. Romanian forces held the element of surprise. On 31 July the Hungarian Army retreated towards Budapest. At the same time, a formation of Hungarian aircraft attacked the Romanian pontoon bridge across the Tisza. They were intercepted by pilots of the 5th Aviation Group who repelled the attack and shot down one Hungarian aircraft.

=== Romanian occupation of Budapest ===
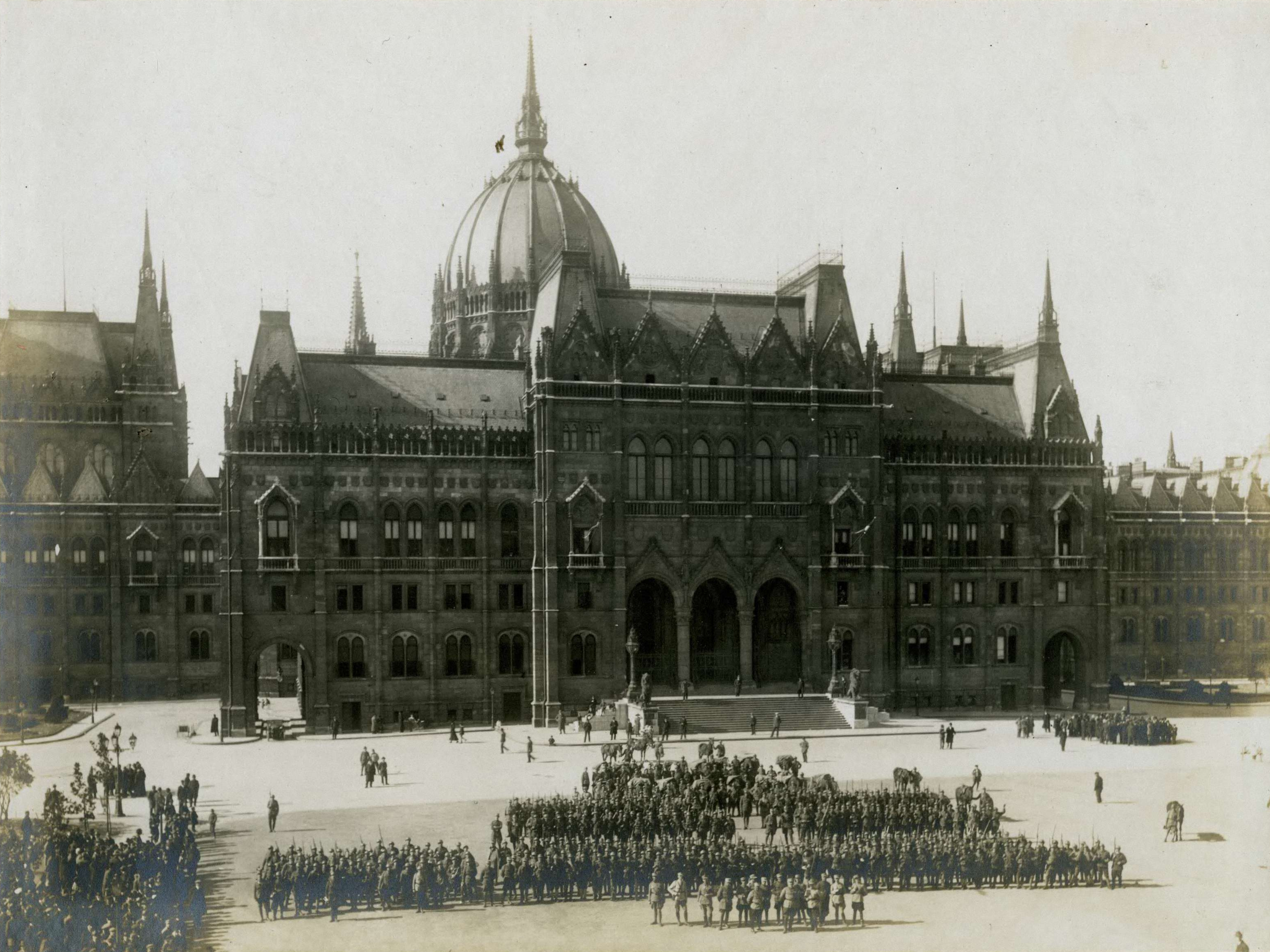
Romanian 27th Infantry Regiment in front of the Hungarian Parliament, Budapest, 1919.

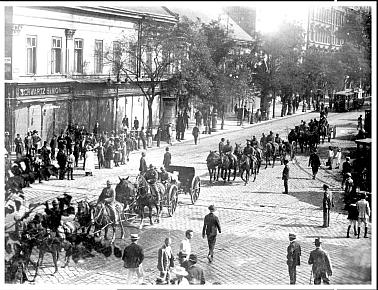
Romanian troops in Budapest, 1919.

Romanian forces continued their advance towards Budapest. On 3 August, under the command of General Gheorghe Rusescu, three squadrons of the 6th Cavalry Regiment of the 4th Brigade entered Budapest. Until noon on 4 August, 400 Romanian soldiers with two artillery guns held Budapest. Then the bulk of the Romanian troops arrived in the city and a parade was held through the city centre in front of the commander, General Moșoiu. Romanian forces continued their advance into Hungary and stopped at Győr.

The incursion of Romania into Hungary caused the heaviest fighting of the war. The Romanian Army's casualties were 123 officers and 6,434 soldiers, with 39 officers and 1,730 soldiers killed, 81 officers and 3,125 soldiers wounded and three officers and 1,579 soldiers missing in action. As of 8 August, the Romanian forces had captured 1,235 Hungarian officers and 10,000 soldiers, seized 350 guns (including two with a caliber of 305 mm), 332 machine guns, 51,450 rifles, 4,316 carbines, 519 revolvers, and 87 airplanes.

== Aftermath ==
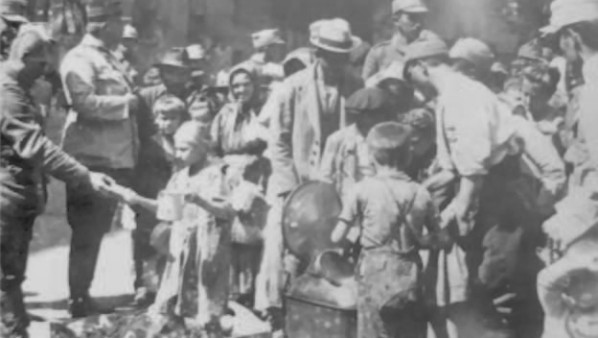
Romanian soldiers feeding the civilian population in Hungary.

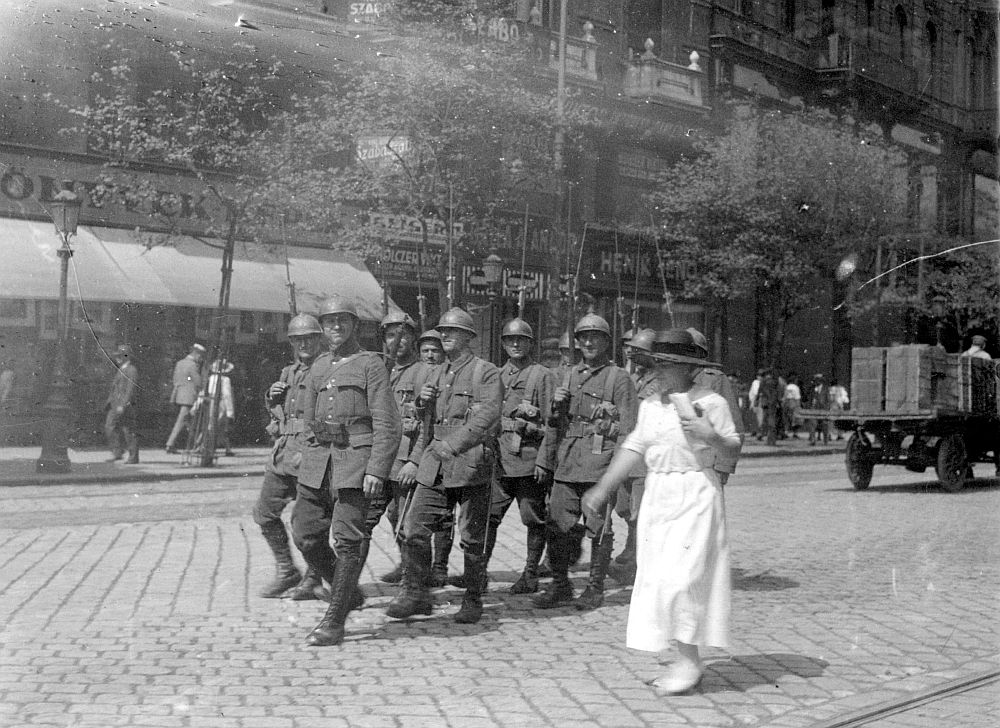
Romanian infantry patrol in Budapest.

On 2 August, Kun fled Hungary towards the Austrian border and eventually reached the Russian SFSR. A socialist government under the leadership of Gyula Peidl was installed in Budapest with the assistance of the Allied council, but its tenure was short-lived.

The counter-revolutionary White House Fraternal Association attempted to install Archduke Joseph August of Austria as Hungary's head of state and István Friedrich as prime minister. However, the Allies would not accept a Habsburg as head of state in Hungary and so a new government was needed.

=== Romanian occupation of Hungary ===
Romania occupied all of Hungary except for an area around Lake Balaton. There, Admiral Miklós Horthy formed a militia with arms from Romania. Horthy was preparing to be Hungary's new leader at the end of the Romanian occupation. His supporters included some far-right nationalists. Horthy's supporters also included members of the White Guards, who had persecuted Bolsheviks and Hungarian Jews, whom they perceived as communists because of their disproportionate participation in Kun's government. The Romanian occupying force also took punitive actions against any revolutionary elements in areas under its control. Initially, Romanian troops provided policing and administrative services in occupied Hungary. Later, under pressure from the Allied council, those roles were returned to the Hungarians. However, in Budapest, only 600 carbines were provided to arm 3,700 policemen.

=== Romanian reparations ===
The Allies were discontented with Romania's conduct during much of the Hungarian–Romanian War. Romania did not follow the Allied council's instructions, for example, by moving west of the Tisza River and by demanding large reparations. The Allies decided that Hungary should pay war reparations in common with the Central Powers. The council pressured Romania to accept the supervision of an Inter-Allied Military Mission to oversee the disarmament of the Hungarian Army and to see the Romanian troops withdraw.

The Inter-Allied Military Mission committee included General Harry Hill Bandholtz, who wrote a detailed diary of the events Reginald Gorton; Jean César Graziani and Ernesto Mombelli. Lieutenant Colonel Guido Romanelli, Mombelli's secretary and former military representative of the Supreme Council in Budapest, was accused of being biased against Romania and was replaced. The relationship between the Inter-Allied Military Mission and Romania was one of discord.

The Allies requested Romania not make its own requisition for reparations and to return any captured military assets. The Inter-Allied Military Mission requested for Romania return to Hungary the largely Hungarian-populated territory between the Tisza River and the first line of demarcation. Romania, under the leadership of Prime Minister Ion Brătianu, did not comply with the requests of the Inter-Allied Military Mission. On 15 November, the Allied council denied Romania reparations from Germany.

The outcome of the negotiations was that Brătianu resigned his prime ministership; Romania received 1% of the total reparations from Germany and limited amounts from Bulgaria and Turkey, Romania signed a peace treaty with Austria, Romania kept reparations from Hungary and Romania's border with Hungary was determined.

Hungary saw the Romanian conditions of armistice as harsh and saw the requisitioning of quotas of goods as looting. It was also required to pay the expenses of the occupying troops. Romania aimed to prevent Hungary from rearming and sought retribution for the plunder of its land by the Central Powers during the First World War. Romania, having been denied by the Allies, also sought compensation for its entire war effort. Under the terms of the Treaty of Saint-Germain-en-Laye concerning Austria and the Treaty of Trianon concerning Hungary, Romania had to pay a "liberation fee" of 230 million gold francs to each. Romania also had to assume a share of the public debt of Austria-Hungary corresponding to the size of the former Austria-Hungary territories that it now held.

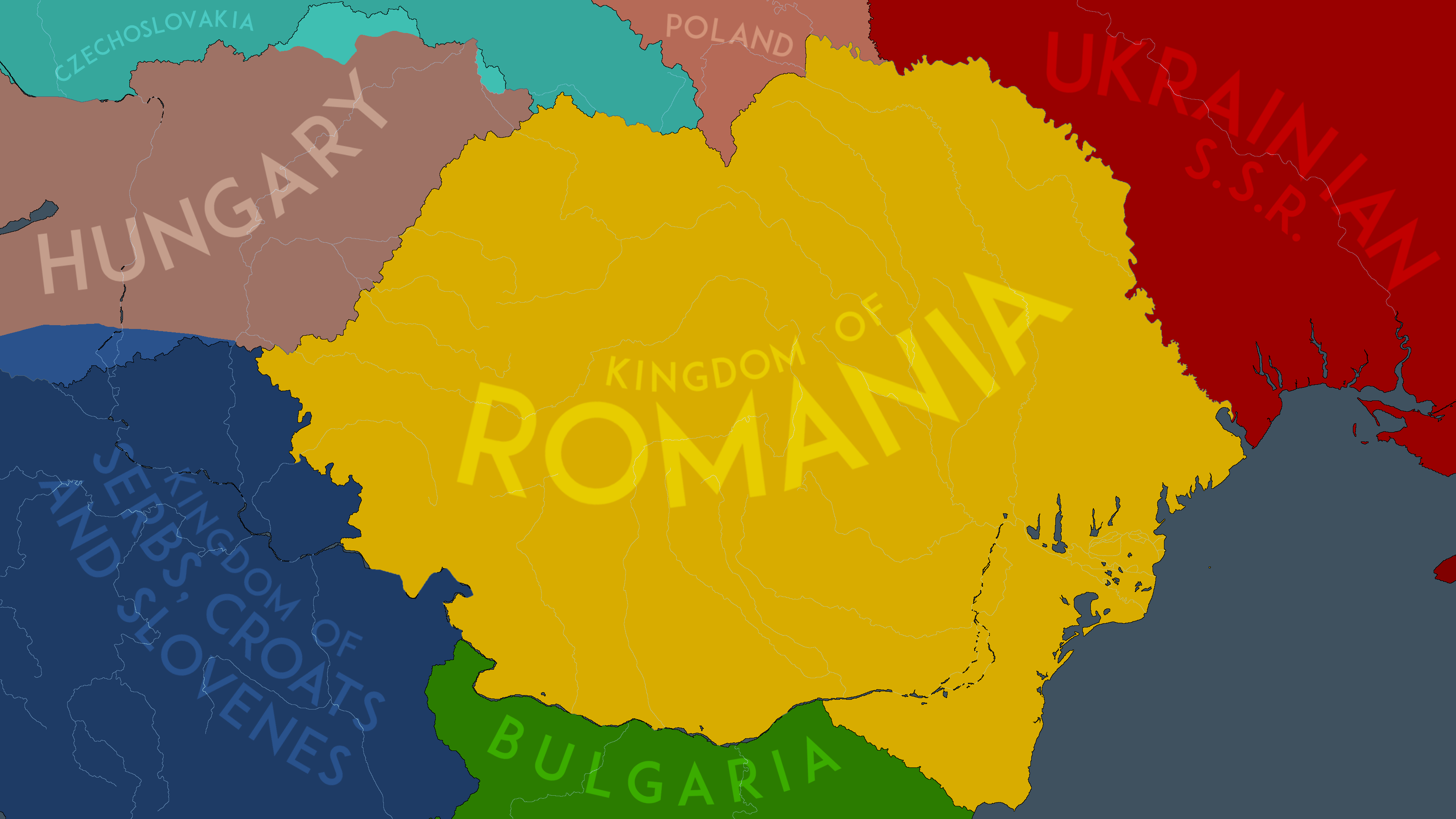
Romania on 4 June 1920, after the Treaty of Trianon.

In early 1920, Romanian troops departed Hungary. They took with them resources including foodstuffs, mineral ores and transportation and factory equipment and also discovered historic bells of Romanian churches in Budapest taken by the Hungarians from the Austro-Hungarian Army, which had not been melted. Hungary ceded all war materials except for the weapons necessary to arm the troops under Horthy's command. It handed to Romania her entire armament industry as well as 50% of the railway rolling stock (800 locomotives and 19,000 cars), 30 percent of all livestock, 30 percent of all agricultural tools and 35,000 wagons of cereals and fodder.

Controversy exists as to whether Romania's actions amounted to looting in terms of the volume and the indiscriminate nature of goods removed from Hungary. Even private motor vehicles could be requisitioned. Although public entities in occupied Hungary bore the brunt of the Romanian-imposed reparation quotas, if they were not enough, the Romanian occupation authorities requisitioned quotes from private entities, including cattle, horses and grain from farms.

== Order of battle ==
- Phase I
  - Romanian Army
    - 1st Vânători Division (Gen. Lecca)
    - 2nd Vânători Division (Gen. Dabija)
    - 6th Infantry Division (Gen. Holban)
      - 11th Infantry Brigade (Col. Botea)
      - 12th Infantry Brigade (Gen. Sachelarie)
    - 7th Infantry Division (Gen. Neculcea)
    - 16th Infantry Division (Gen. Hanzu)
    - 18th Infantry Division (Gen. Papp)
    - 5th Aviation Group (Maj. Enescu)
      - S.2 Squadron (Lt. Ionescu)
      - N.7 Squadron (Lt. Răcășanu)
      - S.12 Squadron (Cpt. Racoveanu)
- Phase II
  - Romanian Army
    - Northern Group (Gen. Moșoiu)
      - Olteanu Detachment
        - two infantry battalions
        - one cavalry brigade
        - one artillery battery
      - 2nd Cavalry Division (Baia Mare) (Gen. Constantinidi)
      - 7th Infantry Division (Zalău) (Gen. Neculcea)
      - 16th Infantry Division (Dej) (Gen. Hanzu)
    - Southern Group (Gen. Mărdărescu)
      - 1st Vânători Division (Deva) (Gen. Lecca)
      - 2nd Vânători Division (Roșia) (Gen. Dabija)
      - 6th Infantry Division (Huedin) (Gen. Holban)
    - 5th Aviation Group (Maj. Enescu)
    - Army Reserve
      - 18th Infantry Division (Gen. Papp)
- Phase III
  - Romanian Army
    - Northern Group (Gen. Mihăescu)
      - 16th Infantry Division (first line) (Gen. Hanzu)
      - 2nd Vânători Division (Gen. Dabija)
    - Southern Group (Gen. Holban)
      - 18th Infantry Division (first line) (Gen. Papp)
      - 1st Vânători Division (Gen. Lecca)
    - Maneuver Group (Gen. Moșoiu)
      - 1st Infantry Division (Gen. Obogeanu)
      - 2nd Cavalry Division (Gen. Davidoglu)
      - 6th Infantry Division (Gen. Olteanu)
    - 5th Aviation Group (Maj. Enescu)
      - B.2 Squadron (Lt. Ionescu)
      - N.7 Squadron (Lt. Răcășanu)
      - S.12 Squadron (Cpt. Racoveanu)
    - Army Reserve
      - 1st Cavalry Division (Gen. Scărișoreanu)
      - 20th Infantry Division (Gen. Darvari)
      - 21st Infantry Division (Gen. Glodeanu)
    - Units brought in during the military actions
      - 7th Infantry Division (Gen. Neculcea)
  - Hungarian Army
    - Northern Group (Tokaj)
      - 2nd Székely Brigade
      - 3rd Székely Brigade
      - 39th Infantry Battalion
      - Szanto detachment
      - Group Reserve (Miskolc)
      - 1st Infantry Division
    - Central Group (Szolnok)
      - 5th Infantry Division
      - 6th Infantry Division
      - 7th Infantry Division
      - 80th International Infantry Brigade
      - Group Reserve (Cegléd)
      - half of the 3rd Infantry Division
    - South Group (Csongrád)
      - 2nd Infantry Division
      - Group Reserve (Kistelek)
      - 4th Infantry Division
    - Hungarian Red Flying Corps
      - nine squadrons
    - Army Reserve (Abony-Cegléd)
      - half of the 3rd Infantry Division
      - one cavalry regiment

== See also ==
- Romanian military intervention in Bessarabia
- Hungarian–Czechoslovak War
- Treaty of Trianon
- Union of Transylvania with Romania
- Hungary–Romania relations

== Bibliography ==
- Bachman, Ronald D., ed. (1991). "Greater Romania and the Occupation of Budapest". Romania: A Country Study. LOC. Washington: GPO. OCLC 470420391.
- Bandholtz, Harry Hill (1933). An Undiplomatic Diary. New York: Columbia University Press. OCLC 716592714.
- Barclay, Glen St. John (1971). 20th Century Nationalism. London: Weidenfeld & Nicolson. ISBN 9780297004783. OCLC 227012.
- Bernád, Dénes; Kliment, Charles K. (2015). Magyar Warriors: The History of the Royal Hungarian Armed Forces, 1919–1945. Vol. 1. Solihull: Helion. ISBN 9781906033880. OCLC 649804607.
- Bodo, Béla (2004). "Paramilitary violence in Hungary after the first world war". East European Quarterly. 38 (2): 129–172. ISSN 0012-8449. ProQuest 195170875.
- Breit, József (1925). "Main Events of the Károlyi Era". Hungarian Revolutionary Movements of 1918–19. Vol. 1. Budapest: Magy. Kir. OCLC 55974053.
- Busky, Donald F. (2002). Communism in History and Theory: The European Experience. Westport, Conn.: Greenwood. ISBN 9780275977344. OCLC 52923931.
- Eby, Cecil D. (2007). Hungary at War: Civilians and Soldiers in World War II. University Park: Penn State University Press. ISBN 9780271040882.
- Grecu, Dan (1995). "The Romanian military occupation of Hungary, April 1919 – March 1920". Romanian Postal History Bulletin. 5 (2): 14–35. OCLC 752328222.
- Iancu, Gheorghe (1995). The Ruling Council: The Integration of Transylvania into Romania. Bibliotheca Rerum Transsilvaniae. Vol. 8. Cluj-Napoca: Center for Transylvanian Studies. ISBN 9789739132787. OCLC 750927127.
- Kirițescu, Constantin (1924). Istoria războiului pentru întregirea României (in Romanian). Vol. 2. Bucharest: România Nouă. OCLC 251736838.
- Lojkó, Miklós (2006). Meddling in Middle Europe: Britain and the 'Lands Between', 1919–1925. New York: CEU Press. ISBN 9789637326233. OCLC 60596123.
- MacMillan, Margaret (2002). Paris 1919, Six Months that Changed the World. New York: Random House. ISBN 9780375760525.
- Mărdărescu, Gheorghe D. (2009). Campania pentru desrobirea Ardealului și ocuparea Budapestei, 1918–1920 (in Romanian). Bucharest: Editura Militară. ISBN 9789733207948.
- Mitrasca, Marcel (2002). Moldova: A Romanian Province Under Russian Rule, Diplomatic History. New York: Algora. ISBN 9781892941862. OCLC 49627640.
- Ormos, M. (1982). "Hungarian Soviet Republic and Intervention by the Entente". War and Society in East Central Europe. Vol. 6. Brooklyn College Press. OCLC 906429961.
- Torrey, Glenn E. (2011). The Romanian Battlefront in World War I. University Press of Kansas. ISBN 9780700620173.
- Treptow, Kurt W. (2003). A History of Romania (fourth ed.). Iași: Center for Romanian Studies. ISBN 9789739432351. OCLC 171567048.
- Webb, Adrian (2008). The Routledge Companion to Central and Eastern Europe since 1919. New York: Routledge. ISBN 9780203928172. OCLC 231413115.
