= Gheorghe Mărdărescu =

Romanian general

Gheorghe D. Mărdărescu
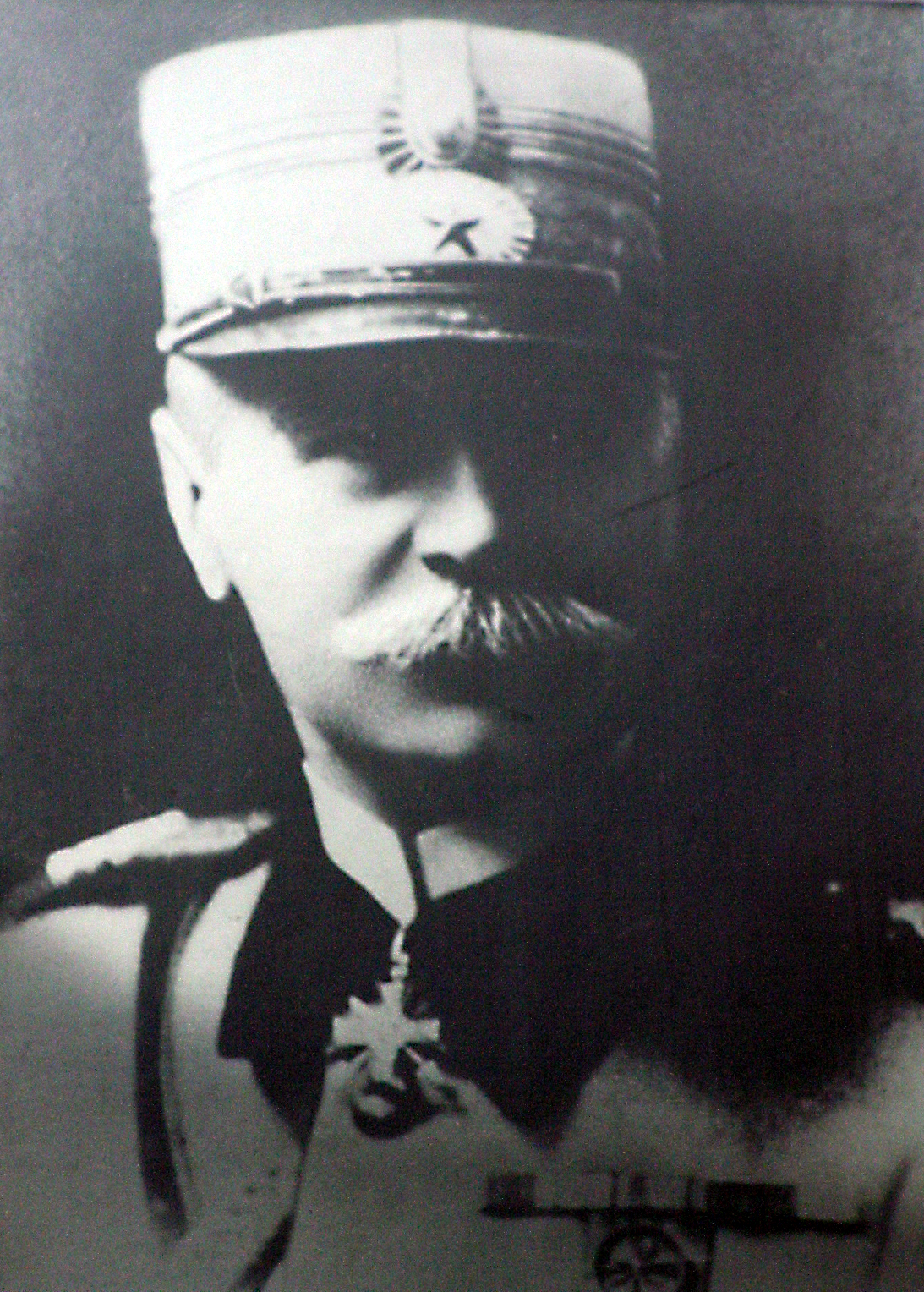
- General Gheorghe Mărdărescu
- Born: August 4, 1866; Iași, United Principalities of Moldavia and Wallachia
- Died: September 5, 1938 (aged 72); Bad Nauheim, Germany
- Education: Higher War School

45th Minister of War of Kingdom of Romania
- In office 20 April 1922 – 29 March 1926
- Prime Minister: Ion I. C. Brătianu
- Preceded by: Ion I. C. Brătianu
- Succeeded by: Ludovic Mircescu
- Military career
- Allegiance: Romanian Army
- Branch: Infantry
- Service years: 1891–1932
- Rank: Lieutenant general
- Commands: 3rd Army Group
- Conflicts: World War I; Romanian Campaign; Hungarian–Romanian War
- Awards: Order of Michael the Brave, 3rd Class; Order of Michael the Brave, 2nd Class

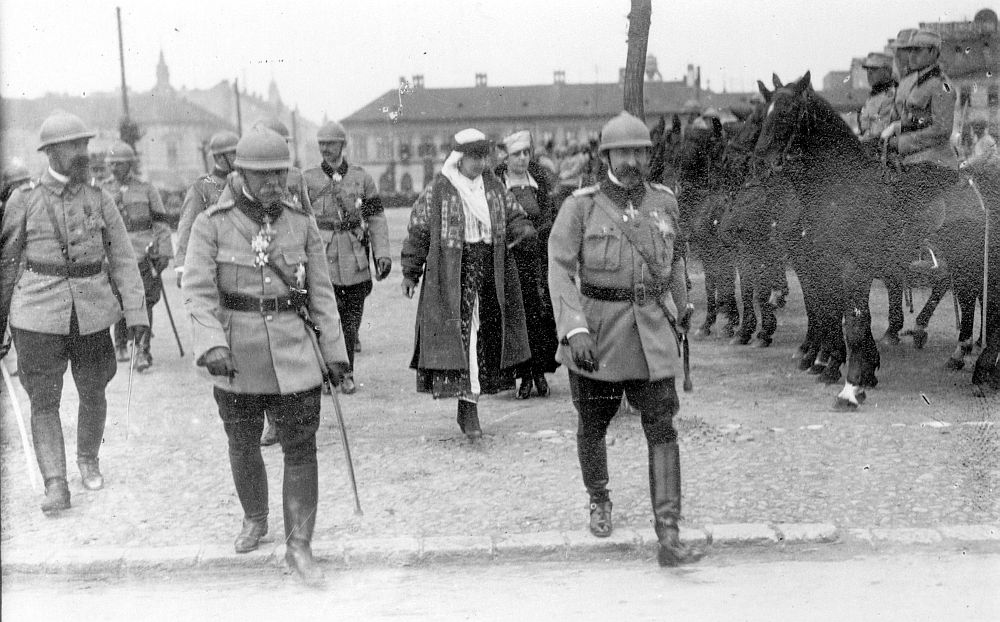
Mărdărescu and King Ferdinand I inspecting the troops in Oradea in 1919

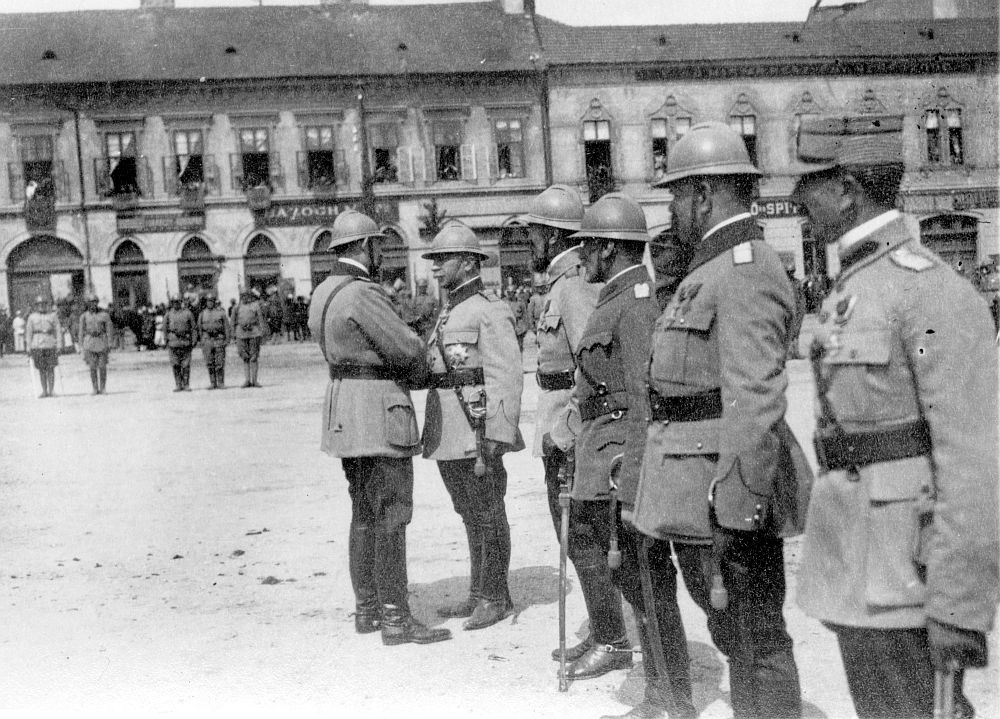
Mărdărescu being decorated by King Ferdinand I in 1919

Gheorghe D. Mărdărescu (4 August 1866 – 5 September 1938) was a Romanian army major general during World War I, a commander during the Hungarian–Romanian War of 1919, and Minister of War from 1922 to 1926.

Mărdărescu was born in Iași, Romania on 4 August 1866. In 1888 he graduated from the Infantry and Cavalry Military School in Bucharest with the rank of second lieutenant, and was promoted to lieutenant in 1891. He pursued his military studies at the Higher War School from 1892 to 1894. He advanced in rank to captain in 1896, and on 10 May 1906 he was promoted to major and named commandant of the Infantry Shooting School. After being promoted to lieutenant colonel in 1910 and colonel in 1913, he was appointed Chief of Staff of 1st Army Corps. In 1915 he became Commandant of the School of Cavalry Officers at the Military Academy.

On 10 May 1916 he was promoted to brigadier general, and on 15 August he took command of the 18th Infantry Brigade. After Romania entered World War I on the side of the Allies on 27 August, Mărdărescu was appointed Chief of Staff of the 3rd Army and then the 2nd Army. Under the command of General Alexandru Averescu, he helped coordinate the Romanian Campaign of 1916, first in the Dobruja, and then during the defense of the Predeal Pass. Mărdărescu was later put in charge of 3rd Army Group (a command he held until 1917), and fought at the battles of Mărăști and Oituz in July–August 1917. In February 1918 he advanced to divisional general.

On 11 April 1919 Mărdărescu took command of all Romanian forces in Transylvania, at the start of the Hungarian–Romanian War. For his actions during the war he was awarded by King Ferdinand the Order of Michael the Brave, 2nd Class.

He served as Minister of War in the cabinet of Ion I. C. Brătianu from 20 April 1922 to 29 March 1926. In 1927 he was promoted to army corps general. He died on 5 September 1938 in Bad Nauheim, Germany.

In August 2019, on the occasion of the 100th anniversary of his victory in the Hungarian–Romanian War, a statue of Mărdărescu was unveiled on the campus of Babeș-Bolyai University in Cluj-Napoca. Streets in Sibiu and Oradea bear his name.

== Publications ==
- Mărdărescu, Gheorghe (2009). Campania pentru desrobirea Ardealului și ocuparea Budapestei, 1918–1920 (in Romanian). București: Editura Militară. ISBN 9789733207948. OCLC 613896204. (Originally published: București: Cartea Românească, 1922.)
