= Khotyn Uprising =

Ukrainian-led insurrection in Bessarabia, 1919

- Part of the Ukrainian War of Independence; the Ukrainian–Soviet War; the Southern Russia intervention
- Map of the uprising on January 22, 1919, before the invasion of Khotyn
Date	7 January – 1 February 1919
Location	Hotin County, Bessarabia, Kingdom of Romania; Podolia Governorate, Ukrainian People's Republic
Result	Romanian victory: Expulsion of the rebels; Shelling of rebel bases in Ukraine

Belligerents
(Ukrainian People's Republic) Ukrainian and Moldovan insurgents Supported by: (Russian Empire) Committee for the Salvation of Bessarabia; (Russian Empire) Volunteer Army (logistical support)	Kingdom of Romania	Ukrainian People's Republic

Commanders and leaders
G. Bărbuță; Georgy Muller; Filipchuk; Ivan F. Liskun; Leonid Y. Tokan; Konstantin Shynkarenko; I. Siyak Polkovnik Zhurari	Gen. Constantin Prezan; Gen. Nicolae Petala; Gen. Cleante Davidoglu; Gen. Stan Poetaș †; Gen. Mihai Schina; Col. Gheorghe Moruzzi; Col. Carol Ressel Col. Victor Tomoroveanu	Ataman G. I. Mayevski

Units involved
≈3 regiments	1st Cavalry Division; 3rd Redcoats Regiment; 40th Infantry Regiment; 37th Infantry Regiment 3rd Border Guards Regiment	none active 60th Infantry Regiment (observing)

Strength
30,000+	unknown	unknown

Casualties and losses
≈11,000 dead 50,000 expelled	159 dead 93 wounded 117 missing	unknown dead 16 Free Cossacks captured

The Khotyn Uprising (Romanian: Răscoala de la Hotin or Revolta de la Hotin; Ukrainian: Хотинське повстання, romanized: Khotyns'ke povstannya) was a Ukrainian-led insurrection in the far-northern tip of the Bessarabia region, nestled between Bukovina and Podolia. It occurred on January 7–February 1, 1919, less than a year after Bessarabia's integration into the Romanian Kingdom. The city it was centered on is now known as Khotyn (Хотин), and is located in Chernivtsi Oblast, Ukraine; in 1919, it was the capital of Hotin County, on the unofficial border between Romania and the Ukrainian People's Republic (UNR). The revolt was carried out by armed locals, mainly Ukrainian peasants, assisted by Cossack deserters from the Ukrainian People's Army and groups of Moldovans, with some support from local Bolsheviks and White Russians. It forms part of the Ukrainian War of Independence, though whether or not the UNR covertly supported it, beyond formally reneging it, is a matter of dispute. The role of Bolsheviks, which has been traditionally highlighted in Romanian and Soviet historiography alike, is similarly debated. The Khotyn Uprising is therefore ambiguously linked to the Russian Civil War and the Ukrainian–Soviet War.

After days of guerrilla activities by peasants, a large contingent of trained partisans crossed the Dniester from UNR territory, and, on January 23, managed to capture the city, creating confusion among Romanian Army garrisons. This group then formed a "Directorate", acting as Khotyn's unrecognized government. It aimed to change the status of the county, or of all Bessarabia, ahead of the Paris Peace Conference, but remained internally divided into pro-UNR and pro-Bolshevik factions. Within days, the Directorate was toppled by the returning Romanian Army under General Cleante Davidoglu, which also began a hunt for armed peasants. Critics of the intervention count 11,000 or more as killed during arbitrary shootings and shelling of localities on both banks of the Dniester, with 50,000 expelled. Romanian Army sources acknowledge that the repression was violent, while they may dispute the body count.

Participants in the revolt were generally alienated by the UNR's inaction, dividing themselves between the Red Army and the Whites. The Khotyn Uprising was closely followed by a raid on Tighina, carried out by the Bessarabian Bolshevik Grigory Kotovsky, whose forces came to include Khotyn veterans. Such incidents secured Bessarabia for Greater Romania, seen by the Entente Powers as a guarantee against communist revolution. In late 1919, the Armed Forces of South Russia, coalescing various White entities, sketched out an attempt to invade Bessarabia, but lost ground to the Red Army. The emerging Soviet Union continued to back partisans in Hotin County during the interwar, until annexing Bessarabia entirely in 1940.

== Background ==
=== Before 1918 ===
The Ukrainian claim to Khotyn (or Hotin) extends back to the Principality of Halych, with reports that Ukrainians had settled there before the lands fell to the Hungarian Kingdom. The city then belonged to the Principality of Moldavia, which grew out of a Hungarian fief, before becoming a tributary state of the Ottoman Empire. Imperial Russia began its incursions into Moldavia with the Pruth River Campaign of 1710–1711, prompting the Ottomans to annex Khotyn Fortress and reconstruct the corresponding Hotin County into a distinct raya in 1714. The city was finally absorbed into Russia following the Bucharest Treaty of 1812, during which time it was recognized by all parties as being distinct from Bessarabia-proper. A census conducted five years later reported that 7,000 "Ruthenian" families had been colonized into the area by Russia. Immigration continued at a steady pace, and was in large part a private enterprise, with hired hands needed for the "immense estates" of Moldo-Bessarabian boyars. By 1900, Ukrainians were a likely majority of the area's population, although no definitive count exists. According to historian Nicolae Enciu, in 1918 there were 121 all-Ukrainian villages, 52 all-Romanian, and 16 mixed. Khotyn town was populated by Bessarabian Jews, though accounts differ on their number, from a vast majority to a fifth of the inhabitants.

Under Russian rule, Hotin County was incorporated with the Bessarabia Governorate, as Khotinsky Uyezd. Its assembly, or Zemstvo, overrepresented Russian nobility, in particular the rival Krupensky and Lisovsky families; in 1900, it was dominated by members of the former, including Alexander N. Krupensky. Its control was looser from 1912, when the Zemstvo presidency went to a Romanian nationalist, Dimitrie A. Ouatul. Russian dominance was again being challenged during World War I, when the northern areas of Hotin were a devastated battlefield, along with the neighboring Duchy of Bukovina. The latter was an extension of Austria-Hungary, which envisioned annexing Khotyn upon defeating Russia and Romania. Following the February Revolution, Ouatul became Commissar for Khotyn, appointed by the Russian Provisional Government. His attempt to reassert control was ineffectual, as previously disenfranchised social groups began forming their own soviets and refusing to abide by central laws. These soviets decreed the socialization of all landed estates.

The Provisional Government fell during the November Revolution, which left Bessarabia and Khotyn with an uncertain status. Bessarabia formally reorganized itself into an autonomous Moldavian Democratic Republic (RDM), headed by the former Russian envoy, Ion Inculeț. Inculeț himself noted that the region, including Khotyn, needed to be defended from Romanian and Ukrainian separatism, and remain attached to a Russian Federated Republic. He cited "devastation in the land of Hotin" as one of the main reasons for establishing a regional government. Ten cohorts of the newly formed Bessarabian Army were ordered to resume control of the region.

Also newly proclaimed, the Ukrainian People's Republic (UNR) issued claims to the whole of Bessarabia or to Khotyn area as early as July 1917, but also maintained friendly relations with the RDM and Romania. Romanian Premier Ion I. C. Brătianu, who still hoped to maintain the Moldavian Front against encroachment by the Central Powers, intended to bring the new regime to his side. By January 1918, the Imperial Russian Army spread out along the Siret River had divided itself into Bolsheviks and UNR loyalists—the latter helped Romanian authorities by repressing the former. The Romanian Army sought both RDM and UNR approval for its subsequent incursion into Bessarabia, where it helped neutralize Bolshevik centers. In the event, the UNR agreed to recognize the RDM, but made specific claims to Hotin and Cetatea Albă counties. Meanwhile, rival claims on the region were made by both the White movement and Soviet Russia, both of which fomented dissent among local Ukrainians.

In the elections of November 1917, opponents of the UNR in Hotin County had chosen Nicolae Bosie-Codreanu, Nicolae Cernăuțeanu, and Constantin Iurcu as their delegates to the Bessarabian people's assembly, or Sfatul Țării. In December, Ukrainian soldiers from the 10th Army Corps expressed a contrary wish, declaring that Khotyn needed to be included in the UNR. A UNR diplomat, Otto Eichelmann, argued that there were no Hotin representatives on show in March 1918, when this legislature voted in favor of union with Romania; nevertheless, Sfatul resolutions made specific reference to unified Bessarabia as extending "from Hotin to Ismail". Following the Eleven Days' War against Soviet Russia, the Central Powers, including Austria, could impose these borders on their defeated adversaries. The Romanian presence in Bessarabia, which coincided with the start of a working alliance between the UNR and the Central Powers, stood as a "clue that [Romanians] too are out of the war with the Central Powers." Trilateral peace negotiations began in February, when Austria announced Romanian diplomats that the Bessarabian question was largely irrelevant to the Central Powers: "the [Bessarabian] question is to be solved directly between Romania, which occupies it militarily, and the Ukrainian and Moldavian republics".

=== Austrian–Romanian–Ukrainian dispute ===
Map of the Hotin issue in 1918

On March 3, the Treaty of Brest effectively meant that the UNR renounced its claims in northern Bessarabia to Austria. The former Khotinsky Uyezd was occupied by the Royal Hungarian Honvéd, on behalf of Austria, that same month. Hungarians controlled the county down to (and including) Ocnița, as well as the northern extremity of Soroca County; under the terms of an armistice, the Romanian Army held on to the remaining areas, including 8 villages in Hotin. Early the following month, the Bukovinan Romanian Ion Nistor invited civilians, including those of Hotin, to "stand guard on the old border, as your grandparents and ancestors before you". On April 14, 1918, Romanian and RDM officials set up a border crossing at Otaci, east of Hotin area and further downstream on the Dniester. UNR–Romanian relations grew more hostile over those days, with rumors emerging that the Ukrainian side had formally protested against the Romanian presence in Bessarabia.

In early May, a new Romanian government, headed by Alexandru Marghiloman, agreed to sign peace with the Central Powers. Although Marghiloman went into the negotiations promising that "under no circumstances would we lose Hotin", the act ceded 600 square kilometers of land to Austrian Bukovina, including parts of the county, alongside the neighboring Hertsa region. Under the resulting regime, parts of Hotin that were either annexed or occupied by Austria were exploited, as a breadbasket for the peoples of Austria-Hungary. This tactic, which was enforced with Marghiloman's acquiescence, led to severe shortages by June 1918. Within months, the Hungarian military administration dissolved all soviets and offices answering to the Central Council of Ukraine, only delegating authority to the reestablished Zemstvo. Faced with such constraints, local Ukrainians began organizing into partisan units.

In April, the UNR itself was replaced by a more Austrian- and White-friendly regime, the Hetmanate, which made some efforts to extend itself into Hotin County and the "four parishes" of Soroca. A branch of the Ukrainian Army, including a 2nd Cavalry Division under Commandant Kolesnikov, was established in Khotyn, whose civilian authorities argued that Marghiloman had willingly renounced his claims to the area. On May 26, judge Oleksa Suharenko was appointed Khotyn's Starosta by authorities from the Podolian Governorate, situated across the Dniester; he never took charge, as he was soon replaced by a P. Izbytskyi. The Austrian authorities ultimately consented to Izbytskyi's arrival, but stripped him of any real power. By July 1918, Romanians grew alarmed about reports that Hetmanate representatives, including Oleksander Shulhyn, were seeking to annex Bessarabia in its entirety.

In November 1918, Germany's armistice changed the course of politics in the region. The unification of Bessarabia with Romania became effective the same month, when regional autonomy was dissolved. In Hotin County, control had remained notional until late autumn: on October 22, 1918, a majority of the Zemstvo voted in favor of the county's reunification with Russia, voicing their fear that the Romanian Army's presence in Bessarabia would end with annexation. As his final act in government, Marghiloman ordered his troops to take Hotin along with Bukovina. The 1st Romanian Cavalry Division, part of the Fifth Army, moved into the former region; it was spearheaded by the 3rd Redcoats Regiment and the 40th Infantry Regiment, both of which were placed under General Cleante Davidoglu. Starosta Izbytskyi advised the local militia not to oppose the Romanian incursion.

Khotyn was ceded by the Austrians on the evening of November 10. Soon after taking over, the Romanian garrison was joined by the 3rd Border Guards Regiment, responding to "alarmist claims" about "Bolshevik" concentrations on the Dniester. A one-kilometer exclusion zone was enforced around the city, food was requisitioned, and the population was ordered to hand in all weapons and ammunition. Davidoglu also announced the swift and exemplary execution of a man from Lipcani "who incited the soldiers to Bolshevism". The incursion also touched Mohyliv-Podilskyi, on the Dniester's left bank, pacified by Romanian troops by request of the Ukrainian mission in Bucharest. On November 20, Izbytskyi registered his protest with General Davidoglu and Redcoats Colonel Gheorghe Moruzzi, reaffirming his belief that Khotyn city was a "territory of the Ukrainian state". He had by then been ordered to leave the county, and was issuing his official acts from across the river, in Kamianets-Podilskyi. In his own proclamation from Khotyn, Davidoglu insisted that "Bessarabia was a Romanian province until 1812, and it remains Romanian land today and forever", warning those who disagreed with him that they could leave for Podolia.

In December, the UNR was reestablished, and its leaders resumed their observation of Romanian activities in Hotin County. Its Directorate heard reports according to which "all peasant, provincial, county and even district congresses" supported the notion that Khotyn belonged in a Greater Ukraine. UNR sources describe late 1918 as marked by a "terror policy", including "shootings of mostly innocent people, the torture of women, children and the elderly, looting, bullying and violence against women [and] a broad system of denunciation". Ukrainian peasants on the Romanian side of the border were additionally troubled by the newly adopted land reform legislation, which returned some land to owners that local soviets had dispossessed, and made other plots subject to ransom.

Reports by UNR Podolian officials noted that by December "gangs of Moldovans", assisted by the Ukrainians of Stara Ushytsia, made random attacks on Romanian border guards across the Dniester. Following one such killing, Romanian artillery shelled Stara Ushytsia on December 24. UNR officials initially agreed with Davidoglu that these were "bandit" raids. They became reluctant when Romanians presented them with an ultimatum to hand in those responsible, and were further alienated when Romanian troops beat up an UNR border guard at Zhvanets. However, on January 5, they refused to acknowledge an appeal by the "Bessarabian National Union", which asked for intervention in support of Hotin County refugees. Instead, Khotyn's inhabitants found support from the Committee for the Salvation of Bessarabia, which reunited Russian nationalists associated with the Whites. With funds received from the Volunteer Army, Polkovnik Zhurari began the training of guerrillas at Tiraspol.

== Unfolding ==
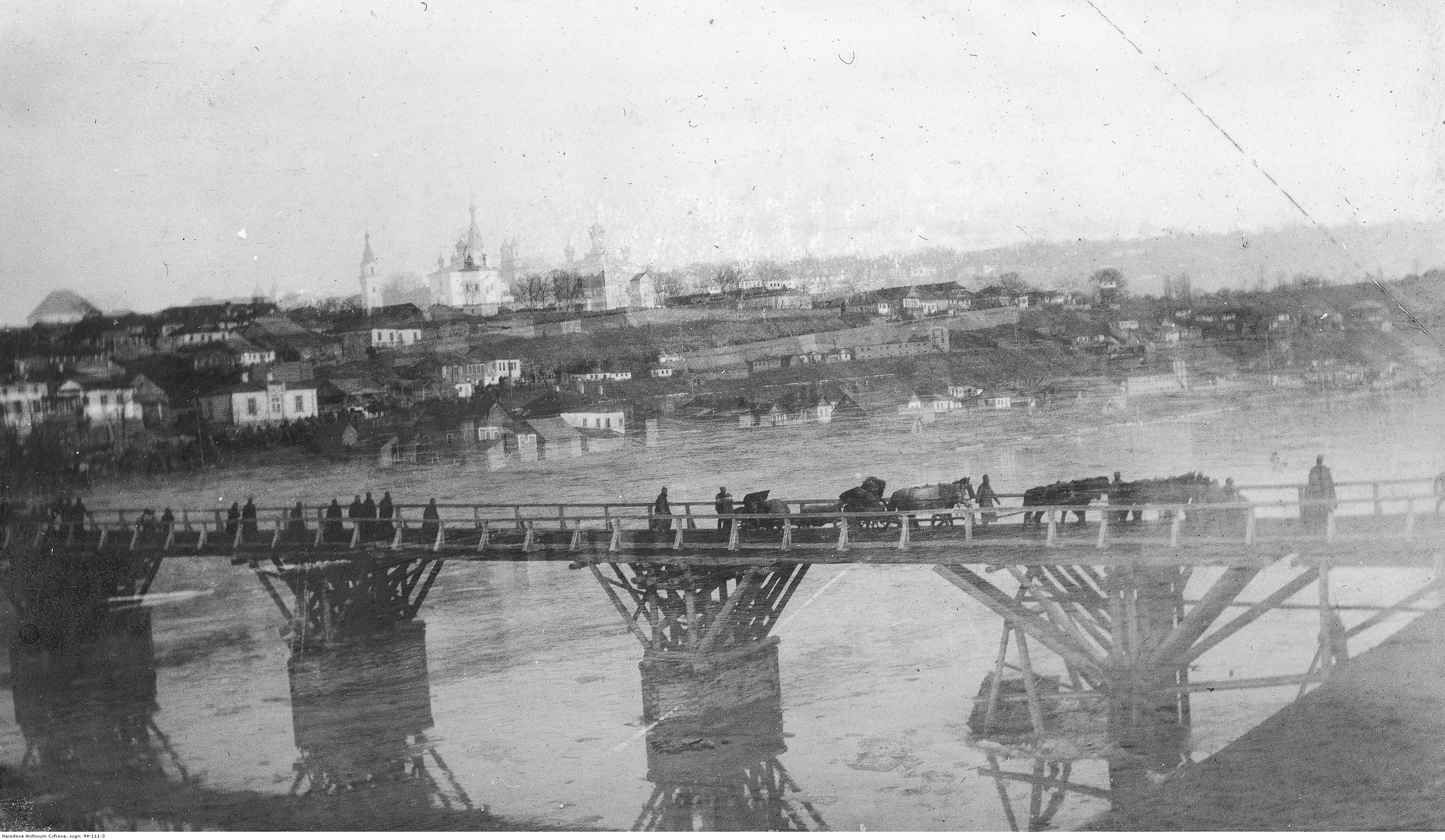
Zhvanets and wooden bridge over the Dniester, seen from Atachi (1915 photograph)

According to Transnistrian academic Piotr Șornikov, Zhurari and his Committee planned for the rebellion to ignite just before the Paris Peace Conference, which was to analyze the issue of Bessarabia and Khotyn. Romanian rule was still consolidating when the armed rebellion began. Scholar Svetlana Suveică notes that the earliest signs of trouble came on the day set for Old-Style Christmas—January 7, 1919. Ukrainian historian Oleksandr Valentynovych Potylchak notes that "the uprising had an international character: both Ukrainians and Moldovans fought in the rebels' ranks." The first attested partisan leader was a Moldovan, known as Gheorghe or Grigore Bărbuță. The representation of ethnicities other than Ukrainians is nevertheless qualified by other authors. Among those whose names were later advanced as "leaders of the revolt", very few were ethnically Romanian or Moldovan. Van Meurs analyzes two lists, respectively provided by V. Lungu and the Moldavian Soviet Encyclopedia, counting 1/8 Romanians or Moldovans in the former, and 3/16 in the latter. Examples noted by the author include Nikifor Adazhyi, D. S. Ciobanu, and I. S. Lungu. Historian M. C. Stănescu additionally describes Leonid Yakovych Tokan (or Toncan) as a Romanian by origin and a priest by training.

Romanian Army historian Ion Giurcă sees Davidoglu as ill-suited for the task of maintaining order, in that he failed to anticipate the subsequent incursion. Stănescu similarly notes that Davidoglu and his aide, Colonel Carol Ressel, "did not consolidate [their] positions", despite being informed of troop movements near Mohyliv. On January 19, Podolian irregulars crossed into Hotin County at Atachi, disarming Romanian border guards and moving in on Soroca. Historian Wim van Meurs describes this attempt as "Bessarabian peasants [...] attempt[ing] to capture the bridge across the Dniester in order to smuggle arms into Bessarabia." These reinforcements succeeded in taking over a string of villages, including Arionești, Codreni, Naslavcea, Pocrovca, and Rudi; on January 23, after reaching Secureni, rebellion erupted in Khotyn itself, chasing out the Romanian garrison.

Two days earlier, most of Davidoglu's units had been dispersed to chase the rebels in surrounding villages, which, as Giurcă notes, only gave impetus to an "uprising of the hostile population". The fall of Khotyn came as he had retreated to Nedăbăuți, and planning further moves toward Noua Suliță, for fear that guerrillas were in control of all surrounding villages. Both Noua Suliță and Nedăbăuți fell to the rebels shortly after, and a Redcoats brigade, under General Mihai Schina, made repeated attempts to regain them. In the ensuing confusion, various targeted attacks killed Romanian Army officers, including Gheorghe Madgearu in Volcineți and General Stan Poetaș in Călărășeuca. The latter assassination is directly attributable to Bărbuță's unit.

As early as January 19, the rebels had formed a Bessarabian Directorate, stemming from the Bessarabian National Union, with both of them provisionally located in Kamianets. At that moment in time, the Directorate is known to have comprised five men: Tokan, Ivan Stepanovych Dunger, M. F. Liskun, Evhen V. Lisak, and I. I. Mardariev. Three days later, one of the groups involved issued an appeal to the international community, including both Soviet Russia and the UNR, which referred to the sufferings of the "Bessarabian people" and to the Directorate as a legitimate government of Bessarabia. A similar text warned that all those "campaigning against the Directorate and against freedom from the Romanian yoke" would be shot, alongside rioters and looters. The Directors had by then deposed and arrested Khotyn's Mayor, Gachikevich (or Gocicherie), ordering the city population to pay them 1.5 million rubles within three days. Most of this burden fell on the local Jews, whom the rebels openly threatened with violence. Romanian writer Constantin Kirițescu further argues that the rebels committed war crimes against Romanian captives, including hanging or eviscerating regular soldiers and lynching a local chief of the Siguranța. Jews felt solidarity with the Romanian soldiers and border guards, some of whom were allowed to hide in Khotyn's synagogues.

Activists were already disunited: right-wingers proposed to create a "Republic of Little Bukovina", centered on Khotyn and opened to annexation by the UNR; leftists urged instead for the formation of a "Bessarabian Democratic Republic", which, as historian Ion Gumenâi argues, would have implicitly functioned as an extension of Soviet Russia. The latter current was illustrated by Iosip Voloshenko-Mardariev, a schoolteacher-turned-activist. Șornikov summarizes this clash of visions within the movement as a "split of patriotic forces into Whites and Reds", with partisans of Ukrainian nationalism and "Little Bukovina" reportedly forming a majority of the Directorate. On January 25, this council, presided upon by Ivan F. Liskun and Tokan, claimed control over 100 localities in Hotin County, and all of what became the Khotyn Raion. The rebel force grew from 2,000 to 30,000 recruits. Styled "Bessarabian People's Army", it formed three regiments: cavalry (Rucșin), artillery (Anadol), and self-defense units (Dăncăuți). A man by the name of Filipchuk was general commander of this force, with Konstantin Shynkarenko serving under him, as leader of Dăncăuți's regiment.

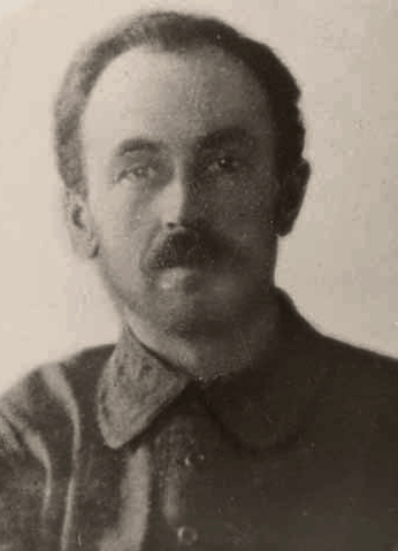
Insurgency leader Ivan F. Liskun, photographed c. 1930

One of the first units to cross into Bessarabia was the garrison of a Ukrainian armored train, which had placed itself under the command of a Bessarabian sailor, Georgy Muller. I. Liskun had reached the area after having served as governor of Odessa the previous month. As reported in Ukrainian sources, he had deserted from the Ukrainian People's Army (UNA) when ordered not to lead his troops over the Dniester. His Haidamaka relied on civilian support, and on several occasions returned into Podolia to raid UNR garrisons for cannons and supplies. Some accounts suggest that members of the UNR's 7th Infantry Regiment had crossed into Bessarabia by the hundreds from January 22. However, these troops had been demobilized after disagreements with the Directorate, and had embraced Bolshevik ideals, rallying under a red flag. Towards its very end, the uprising was apparently led by an UNR politician, I. Siyak. Whether or not UNR Ataman G. I. Mayevski also contributed to this expedition remains a topic of contention. Historian Ion Gumenâi sees him as an actual commander of the rebel troops; a similar verdict was advanced by a collective of authors from the State Archives of Chernivtsi, who suggest that Mayevski distributed arms to the Bessarabian Directorate. Potylchak favorably quotes academic and UNR political figure Dmytro Doroshenko denying that the revolt had any assistance from Mayevski.

Scholar Jonathan Smele argues that the UNR, "at a critical point of the Soviet–Ukrainian War, could not afford to become embroiled in conflict with Romania". An explicit order from the UNR General Staff banned the Podolia Army Corps from intervening to assist the uprising. In his memoirs, however, Doroshenko hints that the UNR's 60th Infantry Regiment was moved to Zhvanets specifically in order to help the rebel expedition, or at least to cover its retreat in case of a Romanian counterattack. Stănescu claims that the UNA directly assisted the rebels with constructing a makeshift bridge at Ocnița. Major M. McLaren of the Royal Navy, who was mistakenly arrested by the rebels as a Romanian spy, reports that no UNA troops were on show, though noting the passing presence of Cossacks with an undisclosed allegiance. Ukrainian officials strongly disavowed rebels when they transported 6 Romanian prisoners into UNR territory. Their reaction was not registered by the Romanian Army, who responded by capturing 16 Free Cossacks from Tiraspol as hostages.

== Violent repression ==
Overall, Liskun's incursion was quickly rejected by the returning Romanian Army. In the early stages of the rebellion, it acted out on its previous warnings, repeatedly shelling the Podolian villages of Nahoriany and Kozliv. During this interval, Davidoglu's troops were joined by various units, including the entire 37th Infantry Regiment, which moved from Bacău to Noua Suliță, and the machine-gunners of Bălți. On January 28–30, the regrouped units, under Colonel Victor Tomoroveanu, forced rebels out of Noua Suliță, Nedăbăuți, Dăncăuți and Cliscăuți, reaching Anadol; other groups retook Rucșin and Rașcov. A state of siege was imposed in neighboring Bukovina, before troops from there could be marched into Hotin County. In Cernăuți, where "cannon shots [from Khotyn] could be heard", the military authorities shut down Ukrainian schools and ordered mass arrests of political suspects.

The counterattack in Khotyn was swift: "already on February 1, the insurgent forces were pushed back over the Dniester, and internal rebellions were repressed". A force still answering to the Khotyn Directorate was able to cross the Dniester back into Podolia, reportedly "without losses". From January 28, the intervention was nominally led by Nicolae Petala, who had taken over from Davidoglu. However, Davidoglu could not be replaced in time, and, with his aide Ressel, was the one to actually take Khotyn; they had already received orders to quell any incursion or revolt "with the greatest violence, including the complete destruction of any [rebel] locality". Davidoglu is therefore widely seen as responsible for the bloody interlude which followed. Although Giurcă believes that Davidoglu acted "within the confines of wartime regulations", fellow generals, including Ion Antonescu, criticized his random killing of civilians, noting that it enshrined Romania's negative image as a "country of savages".

Some such reports concentrate on looting, since Romanian troops were generally ill-prepared for a wintertime action, lacking any winter clothing. Nicolae Coroiu of the 37th Regiment recalls that Davidoglu informed his soldiers to shoot down any armed homeowners and burn down their houses, then "dress up in the clothes of the offending parties." Coroiu recalls however that his troops did not shoot to kill, allowing wounded civilians to flee for safety. General Constantin Prezan, Chief of the Romanian General Staff, approved of the violence, having issued orders that the peaceful civilians be protected, whereas "no pity, no tolerance should be displayed" toward rebels. General Schina's initial proclamations called on local Russians and Moldovans to act as "Christians and good Romanians [...] for there is no sweeter, gentler and more protective country on this earth than the land of Romanians." When confronted with reports of rebel atrocities, Schina pressured Davidoglu to "corral every village, all Bolshevik gangs and rebellious inhabitants"; if rebel activities continued, he was to set whole localities on fire.

Stănescu, relying on "Romanian military documents", notes that "during the aggression they initiated, the Bolsheviks had about 300–400 dead, with several localities whose population had supported them in their actions being destroyed in whole or in part." Other Romanian military records, republished by Potylchak, boasted that seven rebel villages were burned to the ground, with as many as 5,000 insurgents killed; Potylchak himself counts 22 villages destroyed and 11,000 victims, including arbitrary executions of 165 railwaymen and 500 unarmed civilians. He also notes that estimates of 15,000 and higher are probably exaggerated. The latter claim is qualified in Smele's account: "Ukrainian sources suggest that [...] at least 15,000 of those who did not flee were slaughtered by the Romanians." Similar numbers are advanced by Mikhail Meltyukhov, who concludes that "according to official Romanian data, more than 5,000 were killed", and that "15,000 people suffered in one form or another". Scholars I. P. Fostoy and V. M. Podlubny also report 160 railway workers being killed, one of them through immolation. They note that the 11,000 total can be traced to an estimate first publicized by the International Red Aid in 1925. Romanian losses, meanwhile, amounted to 369; this includes 159 killed in action, 93 wounded, and a further 117 missing.

Some murders of civilians are described in Romanian sources. According to Lieutenant Gheorghe Eminescu, his colleague, Captain Mociulschi, shot a railway signalman held responsible for assisting the partisans with their raid on Ocnița. The measures were observed by McLaren and two other British officers touring the UNR; one of them is identified by Stănescu as Lieutenant Edwin Boxhall of Naval Intelligence. According to Giurcă, they favored the UNR and "Ukrainian Bolshevik troops", with reports which exaggerated the scale of repression and victimized non-Romanians, in particular Jews caught between the two sides. Petala, who was ordered to investigate Davidoglu, suggested that the McLaren group were of "doubtful good faith". Likewise, Stănescu reads the British report as a "complete denaturation", with "Bolsheviks" being depicted as "victims of Romanian repressions."

Interrogated by the Romanian side, McLaren noted that Khotyn had been shelled by the Romanians until a civilian delegation had declared it an open city. The occupiers, he recalled, had engaged in widespread looting and "barbaric" beatings. He recalled witnessing one botched execution, in which a suspected robber was left to agonize for hours, as well as the shooting of 53 peasants in Nedăbăuți. According to his reports, several boys and old men were shot during robberies condoned by Davidoglu, while a man of unspecified age, Nikita Zankovsky, was bayonetted in front of his family. Similar accounts mention other acts of cruelty, including at Rucșin, where Major Popescu shot 12 captives after forcing them to dig their own grave, also killing any disabled men he found in civilian homes.

By contrast, Coroiu reports that the one robber to be executed in Khotyn was a Romanian sergeant, caught looting despite an explicit ban. McLaren's account also conflicted with a testimony by Khotyn's deposed mayor, who had been imprisoned alongside the British officers. Gachikevich argued that local Jews appreciated the restoration of order, and that Romanians "caused no harm, other than a few incidents on the city's outskirts." His report was backed by similar statements from two of Khotyn's rabbis, Samuel Haiss and Nahiev Ițikovici, the former of whom also expressed his thanks in a letter to King Ferdinand I of Romania. The McLaren issue was escalated to General Prezan, who asked and obtained that the three British envoys be expelled from Bessarabia.

== Revivals ==
=== Raid on Tighina ===
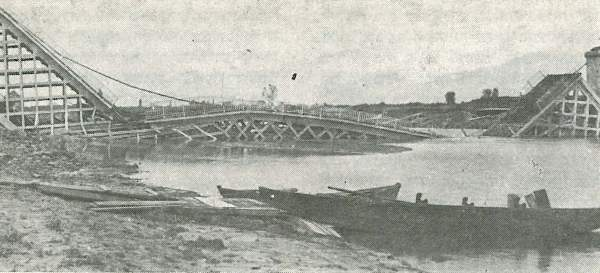
The bridge at Tighina, destroyed by Romanian troops after Grigory Kotovsky's raid

On February 2, guerrilla units made a futile attempt to return at Khotyn through Atachi, prompting another retaliatory bombardment by Romanian artillery units, which consequently became a systematic response to any perceived agitation. This approach led to conciliatory displays by the UNR. That same day, its representatives issued orders for the returning rebels to disarm, and pledged to assist with the investigation into their activities. Podolia's Commissioner declared his conviction that Romanians had no aggressive intent, and acknowledged that they were justified to be in a "nervous mood", with ultimatums as an ultimate "bluff". On February 8, Davidoglu's men machine-gunned the urban center of Mohyliv-Podilskyi, killing two. Before the end of the month, they destroyed all bridges on the upper Dniester, to ensure that communications between Ukrainian groups were rendered more difficult. While Petala asked to command an expeditionary force that would establish a bridgehead in Podolia, Prezan continued to discuss the matter with UNR authorities, warning them to disarm any groups still hiding on the Dniester.

Zhurari's Whites in Tiraspol attempted to provide assistance to the rebels, but moved in too late. In early February, they reportedly acted as negotiators between armed Bolsheviks, led by the Bessarabian Grigory Kotovsky, and the UNR authorities, allowing the latter to withdraw peacefully from Tiraspol. Kotovsky was then pushed out by French troops of the 58th Infantry Regiment, and found himself crossing into Bessarabia, where he managed to chase Romanian soldiers out of Tighina. A French–Romanian division-strength force, assisted by the Polish Blue Army, stepped in to repel Kotovsky's partisans, and reoccupied Tiraspol. Zhurari's men declared their neutrality, but nevertheless found themselves labeled as enemy troops by the French army command; they then joined the intervention forces and participated in political repression, executing among others the father of Bolshevik leader Pavel Tcacenco.

The Khotyn Uprising coincided with the final stages of the Soviet Russian offensive into the UNR's territory, which also led to the establishment of a subordinate Ukrainian SSR. On January 25, the latter's Premier, Christian Rakovsky, had effectively declared war on Romania by stating a Ukrainian Bolshevik claim to both Bessarabia and Bukovina. By contrast, UNR Directors openly rejected "territorial maximalism", in hopes to obtain weapons from Bucharest; these were promised, but never actually arrived. In March 1919, the Directorate moved to Husiatyn, and failed to maintain a grip on Podolia. The area came to be governed by the Ukrainian Socialist-Revolutionary Party (allegedly answering to Mykhailo Hrushevsky), though military control was resumed after a counter-coup. In Dunaivtsi Raion, veterans of the Khotyn Uprising formed a Bessarabian Brigade, which restated its alliance with Russia and commitment to Bolshevism. It nevertheless refused to do battle against the UNR, and was disarmed by envoys from Husiatyn in early April.

As many as 50,000 peasants from around Khotyn, and some 4,000 to 10,000 armed rebels, crossed the Dniester, settling in either UNR or Soviet territories. Meanwhile, those refugees who still rejected communism appealed for support from the Entente Powers: on February 4, their "general assembly" in Zhvanets pleaded with the Entente to demand the immediate withdrawal of Romanian troops from Hotin County. Other circles in Ukraine also embraced the cause. On February 12, the British legation in Odessa received a letter of protest from a self-proclaimed delegation of Bessarabians, which included S. M. Wolkenstein and H. M. Kudik as Khotyn delegates. This text affirmed commitment not the UNR, but to Russia, depicting Romania as an "invader", and its culture as "Asian".

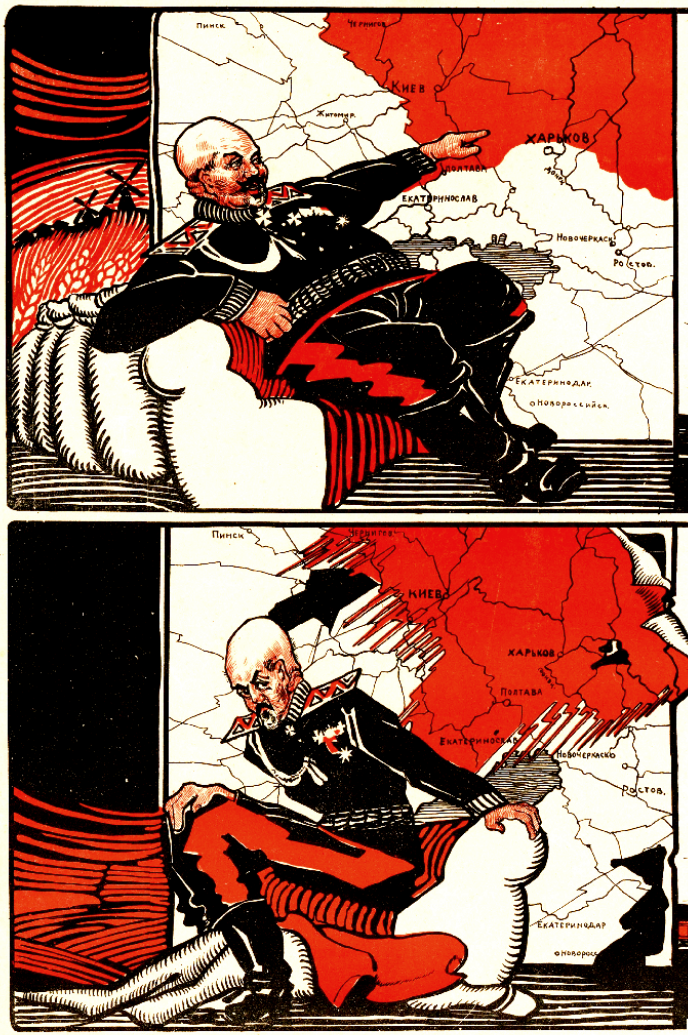
The two stages of Denikin's offensive, as depicted by the Bolshevik poster artist Nikolay Pomanskiy in 1919

The Red Army, under Vladimir Antonov-Ovseyenko, advanced southwards and conquered most of Podolia by April. The region was incorporated into the Ukrainian SSR; this new regime quickly restored the Bessarabian Brigade, but purged it of political suspects. During the early days of May, Antonov considered plans for immediately "freeing Bessarabia" by invading through Khotyn. He was finally dissuaded from ordering it by Romanian successes on the Hungarian Front, and by supply inadequacies. Ukrainian–Romanian skirmishes continued over several months, just as the Peace Conference began analyzing the eastern borders of Greater Romania. Atachi's inhabitants remained exceptionally hostile to Romanian rule, and Soviet soldiers felt encouraged to fire on Romanian positions during May 30; suspicions arose in Romanian circles that an "international battalion" was being trained to invade Bessarabia from Mohyliv.

Romanians were still pained by echoes of Davidoglu's action, and knew that the Conference could recognize Ukrainian demands in Hotin County. As noted by Ukrainian historian Yaroslav Popenko: "From the very first days of the conference, Romanian diplomats had been active in arguing that the Khotyn Uprising was an attempt by the Bolsheviks to destabilize the country and spread its ideology further into Europe. Against the background of anti-Bolshevik sentiments among the major states, such an 'interpretation' of events was an extremely successful diplomatic and propaganda step." Popenko also notes that this approach came to be favored by the Allied intervention forces in Russia, who advised the UNR to settle its border issues with Romania, viewing the latter as the "final bulwark against Bolshevism".

=== VSYuR and Zakordot ===
Zhurari sealed a pact with the Red Army and was allowed to leave Tiraspol unharmed; some of his men returned to Bessarabia, while others were admitted into the Red Army. Both groups may have played a part in the Bolshevik attempt to seize Tighina, on May 27, 1919 (see Bender Uprising). Whites, unlike communists, were generally spared by the Romanian Army, but the authorities still intervened when, in June, a Polkovnik Gagauz was caught preaching revolution to the inhabitants of Comrat. Such agitation largely ceased in June, when the Romanian government allowed N. N. Kozlov and A. A. Gepetskiy to recruit Bessarabian White officers for service in the Armed Forces of South Russia (VSYuR), which secured a base in Odessa and pushed Antonov's forces out of the region. Various members of the Salvation Committee proposed to Anton Denikin that they stage instead a takeover of Bessarabia, and Denikin promised to assist them after first "finish[ing] off" the UNR. In August, Konstantyn A. Matsevych, who served as UNR diplomatic representative in Romania, made a futile effort to reconcile the Directorate with Denikin.

While acting as head of the VSYuR counterintelligence in Odessa, Gepetskiy permitted Bolsheviks to assemble, despite Denikin's large-scale offensive into Russia. As Șornikov notes, he still prioritized the Bessarabian takeover ahead of all other issues, and effectively had a truce with communist partisans. The All-Russian National Center, functioning in the White-held city on Rostov-on-Don, maintained a claim to both Bessarabia and Ukraine, accusing Romania and the UNR of colluding with each other to partition the area. Also working under Denikin's watch, N. A. Zelenetskiy began forming the 14th Infantry Division and 14th Artillery Brigade, specifically for the recovery of Bessarabia.

Denikin's successes also rekindled partisan activity in Podolia. VSYuR's Gagauz was able to recruit some 13,000 veterans from the Ukrainian Galician Army, who were then distributed to garrisons along the Dniester, ostensibly preparing to "liberate Bessarabia" upon the end of the Russian Civil War. In November, following Denikin's defeat at Orel, these units were moved to assist against the advancing Red Army. Ukrainian communist writer Hrihoriy Piddubny claimed that a new riot, breaking out that same month, among recruits stationed with the Romanian Army in Cernăuți, had a pro-Soviet agenda and was being led by a "conspiratorial paramilitary organization". According to Piddubny, the rebels sought to capture Khotyn, but were pushed back by loyalist cavalrymen—the clandestine communist circle also collapsed in the immediate aftermath. Gepetskiy's men were still preparing for an attack on Bessarabia, and collected 12 million rubles for this goal. These were confiscated by Kotovsky and the Red Army, which retook Tiraspol without a fight in February 1920. These units included various veterans of Filipchuk's army in Khotyn, including Shynkarenko and M. I. Nyagu, both of whom had command roles. Shynkarenko was later called up to fight the Basmachi movement in Turkestan.

The Red Army allowed VSYuR survivors under Nikolai Bredov to move into Nova Ushytsia, just north of Khotyn. They surrendered to the Polish Army, with Romania having repeatedly refused them entry. From that moment on, the Soviets could form their own networks in Khotyn; a Romanian diplomatic cable from June 1920 claims that 200 recruiters for the Red Army were active in the county. From October, the Ukrainian Communist Party's office for foreign infiltration, Zakordot, took over the task of destabilizing the Romanian presence. By 1921, they had organized a network of small-scale guerrilla units, which crossed the Dniester for hit-and-run attacks on Romanian targets. Zakordot raids in mid-1921 resulted in the targeted murders of officials and clergymen in Dăncăuți, Poiana and Rașcov. These groups also made efforts to find and punish landowner Moșan, who stood accused of having organized violent retribution after the 1919 uprising. In August 1921, they attacked Moșan's manor outside Stălinești, killing several members of his family. Meanwhile, the anti-communist segment of the Ukrainian diaspora was strengthened by some 400 UNR refugees, some of whom found work at Hotin County's sugar mill.

Ahead of the November 1919 elections, Hotin County became a hub of the Bessarabian Peasants' Party (PȚB), which canvassed among the Jewish and Ukrainian populace. The group was the only one to submit a list, which had support from some 62% of registered voters (an additional 7.6% cast blank votes). All of the county's first representatives in the Assembly of Deputies were PȚB members, but represented three distinct ethnicities: Daniel Ciugureanu stood for the Romanians, Iancu Melic-Melicsohn for the Jews, and Pavel Kitaigorodski for the Ukrainians. Romanian Police officials in the region reportedly viewed all Hotin deputies as "more than suspicious", in that they endorsed the notion of an autonomous Bessarabia.

=== Later history ===
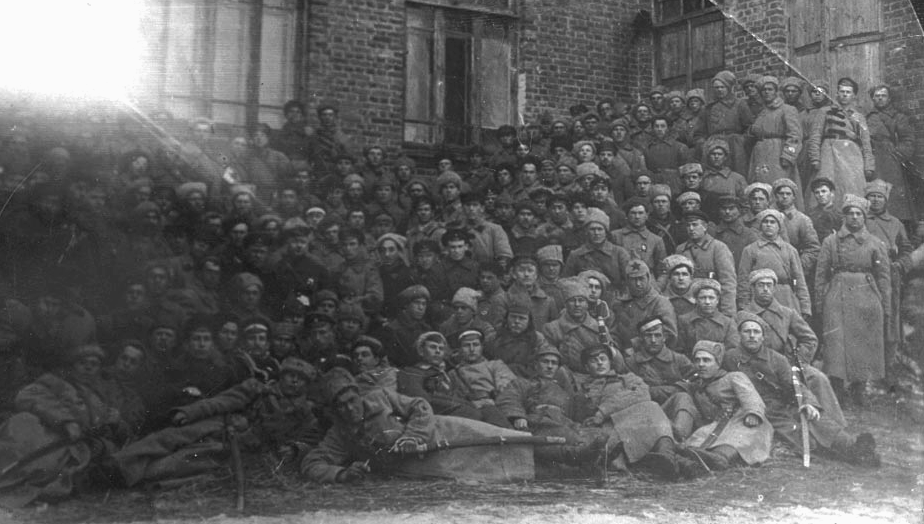
Veterans of Kotovsky's Bolshevik partisan units reunited for a conference in Soviet territory, 1922. The image reportedly includes two Ukrainian participants in the Khotyn Uprising: Ya. Barchuk and P. Oliynyk

The UNR was dissolved upon the conclusion of its war with Russia in late 1921, leaving Khotyn and Bessarabia to be governed by Romania, directly on its closed border with the Soviet Union. Prosecution of the 1919 rebels was pursued over several years. Rebels captured before January 23 were treated with more leniency, and made subject to trials by military courts. Examples include Alexei Borodaty and M. V. Bulkat, the latter of whom died in Craiova prison in 1924. In late 1921, Romanian troops captured a "Bodnarciuc gang", which had been active in northern Bessarabia, and which, they alleged, "maintained strong links with well-organized gangs from across the Dniester, who were themselves Bessarabians crossed over during the revolution of 1919." Bărbuță's aide S. Foșu was finally captured in 1929, and sentenced to death for his participation in Poetaș's killing.

Romanian authorities in Hotin became widely known for their mismanagement and embezzlement, with wide-ranging consequences: in 1923, the prefect was under investigation for hoarding all pigs out of Hotin and selling them in Bukovina for personal gain. Reports by the Ministry of Education signaled that Hotin inhabitants remained profoundly anti-Romanian. Officials intended to subvert the trend by closing down Russian-language education and enforcing Romanianization. A controversy erupted in 1925–1926, when Hotin peasant Ioan Mosoloc was sentenced to 5 years of servitude for participation in the 1919 revolt. On retrial, he was able to prove that he had been entirely absent from Bessarabia during the events, and that statements to the contrary had been fabricated by the hostile Gendarmerie.

During the early 1930s, the region was more heavily impacted by the Great Depression, prompting renewed activities by communist agents, but also agitation the antisemitic National-Christian Defense League. In May 1933, Vasily Gotinchan attempted to establish a local chapter of the pro-communist Liberation Party, but was apprehended and put on trial. A Ukrainian branch of the Romanian Communist Party was finally set up regionally, with Shulim Abramovich Kryvyi emerging as its chief organizer in 1939. In 1938, the National Renaissance Front regime bid on subverting traditional loyalties in Bessarabia, dividing the region into larger administrative units that straddled old borders into Bukovina and Western Moldavia. As a result, Hotin County was dissolved, and its territory was assigned to Ținutul Suceava. The passage of antisemitic laws also came with targeted persecution, including the attempted expulsion of all Jews living in Zelena.

This episode ended in 1940, as most of Khotyn was annexed to the Ukrainian SSR during the Soviet occupation of Bessarabia and northern Bukovina; the core areas of Bessarabia, meanwhile, formed a separate Moldavian SSR. The border between these two Soviet entities was settled on August 2, 1940 (effectively on November 4), when the southern third of Hotin County was recognized as part of the Moldavian SSR. The northern regions, which remained under Ukrainian administration, had a Ukrainian plurality of 41.6%, and were amalgamated with Bukovinian areas into Chernivtsi Oblast. As noted by van Meurs, this arrangement was due to Ukrainian officials using their "political clout", as a "strong Ukrainian involvement" had underpinned the Soviet moves of 1940. Approval was obtained from the Moldavian SSR Premier, Tihon Konstantinov, but not from the Moldovan population. This reportedly contradicted fundamental laws of the Moldavian Autonomous Republic, which were still in place before the passage of a 1941 Constitution.

The Soviet annexation occurred after the Great Purge, which had seen Shynkarenko being sidelined by the Soviets and narrowly escaping execution; several Khotyn refugees were shot at that stage by the NKVD, followed by at least 224 new Soviet citizens in 1940–1941. While in Bukovina the NKVD began a purge of Ukrainian elites, many of whom fled with the Romanian Army, Ukrainians around Khotyn appear to have welcomed the change of borders, with reports that Romanian garrisons had been humiliated by civilians during the eviction. Similar incidents occurred in other parts of Bessarabia, and, before 1941, Romanian Army folklore enshrined in public memory the claim that Jews were the main culprits, despite evidence to the contrary.

A re-annexation by Romania occurred in 1941, as part of Operation Barbarossa; at the time, Romania was under a dictatorial government led by Davidoglu's former rival, Ion Antonescu. From September 4, 1941, Hotin County was attached to the Romanian Bukovina Governorate. Shortly before this formal reoccupation, Romanian troops in Atachi tried to expel the entire Jewish population from Hotin County into Reichskommissariat Ukraine, a matter which caused tension between them and Nazi Germany. More than 1,000 "slow-moving" Jews where shot by the Einsatzgruppen during the subsequent push-back. All surviving returnees were then expelled into camps in Transnistria Governorate, with many more killed by the Romanian Army on the way there. The Governorate was also set to welcome the entire Ukrainian and Lipovan population of Bessarabia, in exchange for any Romanian-speakers on that side. Antonescu and his favorite demographer, Sabin Manuilă, viewed the Dniester as a defensible frontier, but agreed to relinquish northern Hotin and Cernăuți counties to a Ukrainian state, in exchange for Pokuttya. Ukrainian culture was still banned under Antonescu, and its advocates were forced to assimilate or be marginalized.

Under the Antonescu regime, pro-Soviet resistance was mounted by the Komsomol, which attempted sabotage and assassination. Several were shot in retaliation during 1941–1942—including a participant in the 1919 revolt—and 148 were imprisoned. In August 1944, Bessarabia was retaken by the Soviets, and the 1940 borders restored. However, northern Hotin remained an irredenta of the Moldavian SSR, with republican leader Nikita Salogor suggesting its reincorporation in 1946. From late 1944, the Ukrainian Insurgent Army (UPA), which fought against the Soviets, formed a partisan unit in Khotyn, under Dmytro "Pavlenko" Kozmenko. The period also witnessed the emergence of an anti-communist partisan movement in the Moldavian SSR, with collaboration between Moldovans (or Romanians) and the UPA at Medveja, just south of the demarcation line. In 1944, the People's Commissariat for State Security reported neutralizing pockets of resistance maintained by the far-right National Christian Party outside Tîrnova and Ocnița. In 1945, UPA partisan Oleksandr Sokoliansky raided Zarozhany and managed to kill the two Soviet officers managing intelligence work in Khotyn Raion. The group Arcașii lui Ștefan, active south of the Moldavian–Ukrainian border, attempted to establish contacts with both the UPA and anti-communist partisans in Romania, before being liquidated by the Soviets in 1947–1949. Subversive actions were still carried out to 1949 by partisan commander Ivan Menzak, who attempted to use Khotyn as a base for reestablishing a UPA presence in Right-bank Ukraine.

== Legacy ==
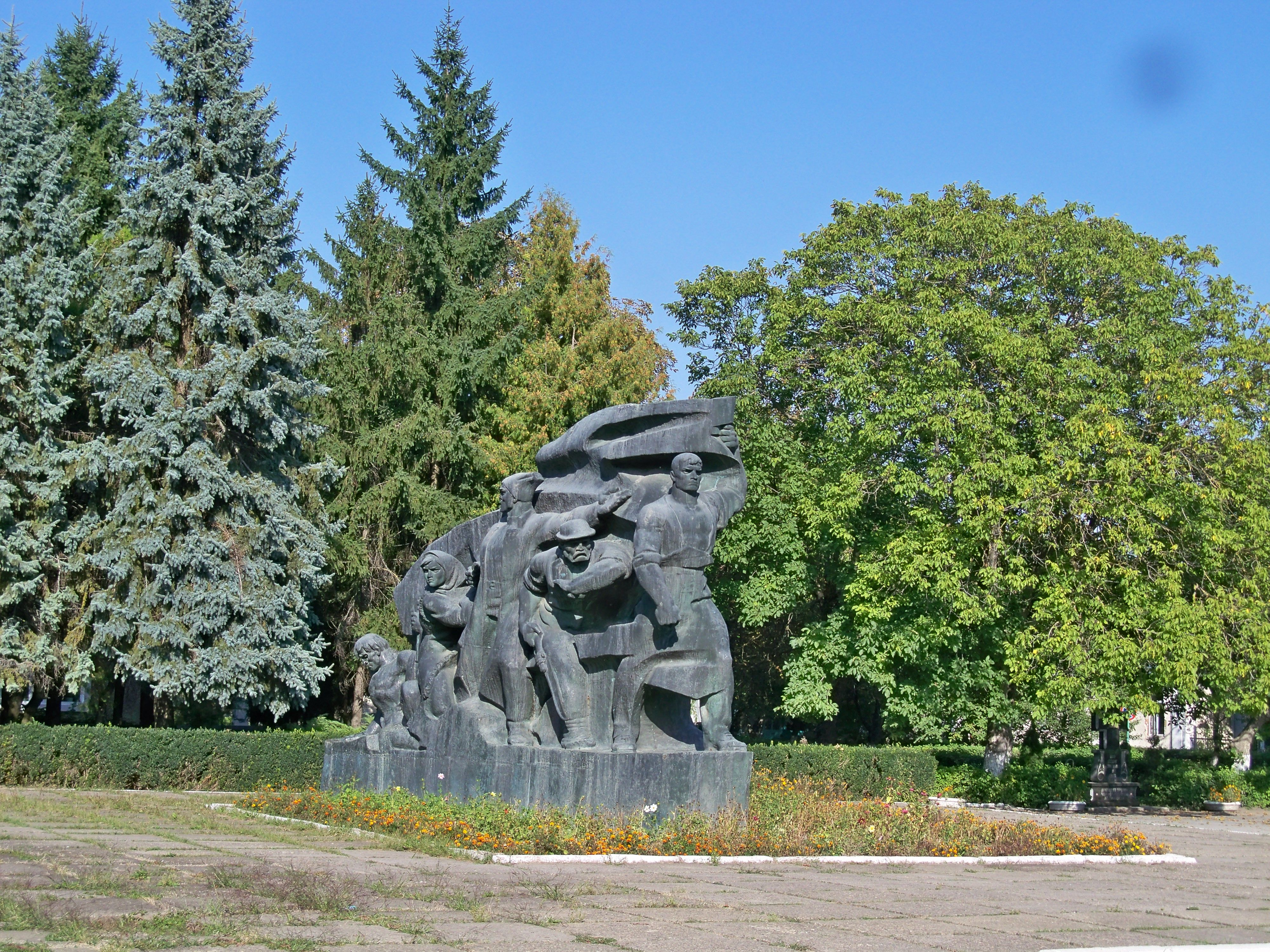
Soviet-era monument to the Heroes of the uprising in Khotyn

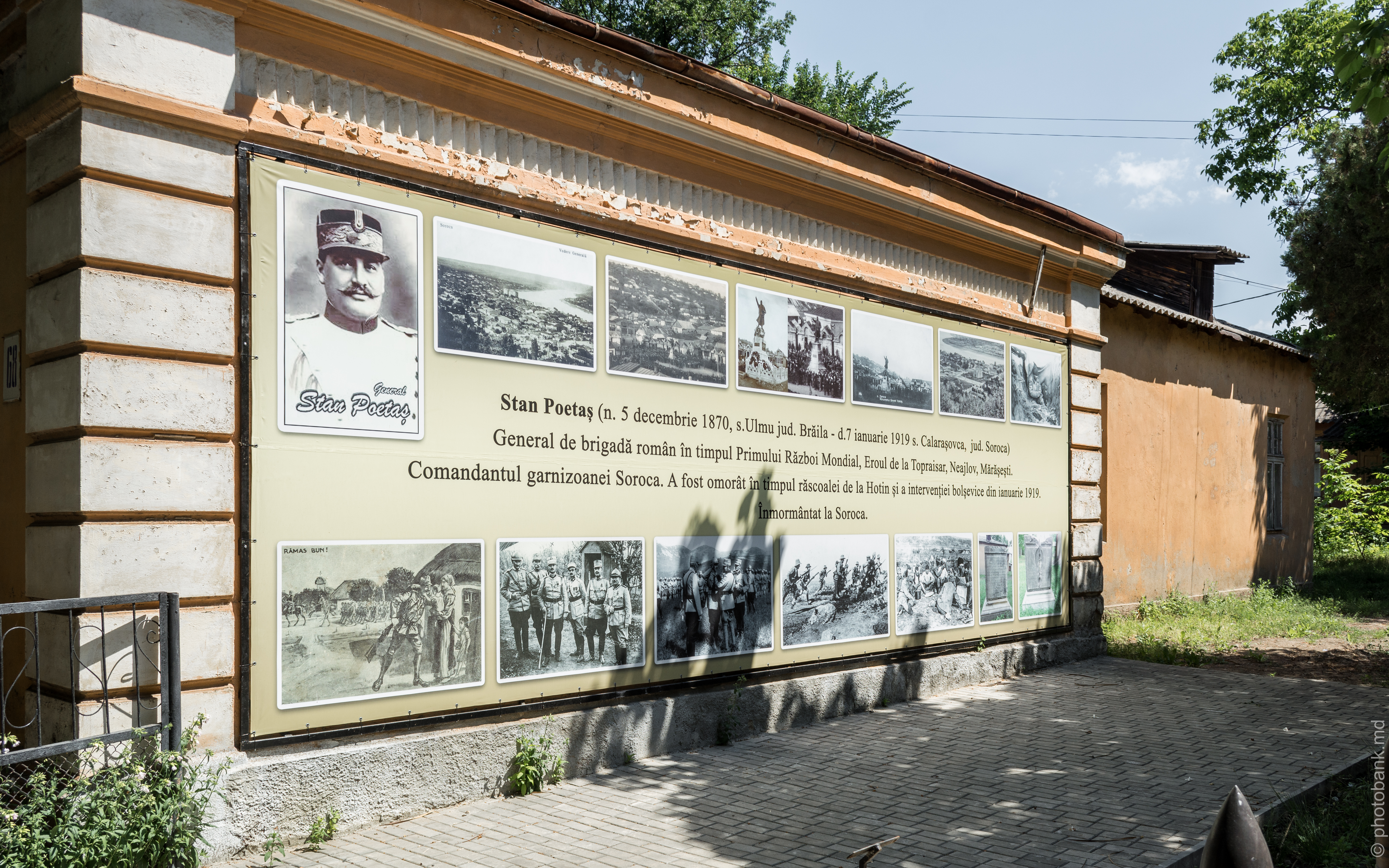
Banner commemorating Stan Poetaș at Soroca Ethnographic Museum, May 2018; text mentions the uprising as a "Bolshevik incursion"

Suveică notes that Romanian and Western European perspectives on the Khotyn Uprising converge on the claim that it was at most a peasants' revolt, and that it could never canvass for support outside its ethnic Ukrainian base. As argued by Romanian historian Gheorghe I. Brătianu: "not one uprising took place in Bessarabia that was not directly organized and supervised by communist partisans sent in from areas across the Dniester. An attack of some importance took place in late December 1918 [sic] and created troubles among the Ruthenian population in Hotin county; Romanian general Poetaș was killed during these fights. But aside from this insurrection, which had been long in preparation, and supported by gangs moving in from Ukraine, there was no other movement against the union, which represented the will of an uncontested majority." Brătianu sees a direct link between the Khotyn events and the 1924 rebellion at Tatarbunar, "also involving a foreign population." The non-communist orientation of at least part of the Uprising was attested as early as 1919 by another Romanian scholar, Nicolae Iorga. His diaries initially referred to the rebels as "Bolsheviks", before noting that they were "in fact [UNR] soldiers". However, in 1995, Stănescu referred to the Khotyn affair as "orchestrated by the Bolshevik government", and suggests that all rebel "commissions and committees" had "direct links with the Bolshevik army".

Potylchak views Romanian historiography in both the royal period and the national communism of the 1980s as having "reduce[d] the uprising to solely a 'Bolshevik revolt', and minimize[d] the anti-Ukrainian actions" undertaken in its wake. In his reading, the quashing of the uprising signified a "colonial expansion", to which the UNR could only oppose "neutrality", despite being fundamentally sympathetic to the rebels. Potylchak also proposes a critical view of post-Soviet Ukrainian readings of Khotyn, in that it fails to account for the popular and spontaneous nature of the struggle and instead overemphasizes Mayevski's alleged contribution. Another Ukrainian scholar, V. Kroytor, is openly critical of the UNR's "excessively cautious and inconsistent" behavior in respect to Romanian maneuvers.

Soviet historiography and Moldovenist authors focused on claims that the revolt was indicative of a brewing class conflict, with Romanian authorities depicted as irredeemably reactionary; as noted by Suveică, Soviet monographs on the revolt achieved this goal by relying on autobiographical writings contributed by the rebels, and by citing Soviet propaganda from c. 1920 as a primary source. Such reviews also highlighted the connections between Khotyn and Tatarbunar, but ascribed them a different meaning, as samples of "heroic struggle" by the "Bessarabian workers." As noted by van Meurs, the proletarian component was spuriously highlighted, and the revolt described as related to the Red Army's clashes with the UNR and the Allied intervention forces. A 1976 monograph advanced the claim that Bolsheviks prepared the revolt to coincide with the Red Army's advance into Podolia, but that they could not control its timing. These narratives also contradicted themselves in claiming that UNR agents had "infiltrated the leadership of the revolt", accounting for its ultimate failure. Potylchak argues that such sources also distort the truth by arguing that Romanians intervened in order to assist the UNR.

The earliest author to include Khotyn into the Soviet pantheon was Rakovsky, in 1925; his account was expanded upon by Naum Nartsov in 1940. Nartsov reported the mainstream view, according to which 50,000 peasants had fled into newly conquered Soviet territory during the Romanian backlash, but, as noted by van Meurs, his count was later "revised as 50,000 casualties." Soviet authors then claimed that an additional 30,000 were refugees, and changed the chronological setting to argue that at least some of the flights had taken place before the uprising; this allowed them to claim that any participation from across the Dniester was in fact also Bessarabian, rather than Ukrainian. In his 1928 monograph, Piddubny further argued that the uprising had stretched thin the Romanian army, and that Bukovina could have then been able to gain its independence. He blames the "servile Bukovinian Ukrainian petty bourgeoisie", and the indecisive Romanian autonomist, Aurel Onciul, for not seizing on this opportunity.

Within this setting, a dispute ensued between the official historiographers of Soviet Moldavia and Soviet Ukraine, after the former included references to Khotyn into Moldavian history textbooks of the early 1950s. Unusually, these commented on the both Khotyn and Tatarbunar as "weak, isolated, ill-prepared, and mismanaged" uprisings. The standard view was wholly replaced in 1960s works, which depicted Khotyn as a "major revolt". In 1970–1978, a large-scale effort was made to collect and publish documents on the uprising from the various Soviet archives. Though present in both Romanian and Soviet interpretations, any claims of Soviet participation in the Khotyn revolt are reviewed with skepticism by van Meurs, who notes that the movement was local. He proposes that both the Hotin revolt, and the May 1919 skirmish in Tighina had support from across the Dniester, but that only the latter of the two was Soviet-sponsored. In 2017, Romanian military historian Alexandru Madgearu made a note that, despite being embraced by "several historians", any claim that the revolt was Bolshevik-instigated had been proven counterfactual. Kroytor suggests that the UNR's hesitation to assist pushed Khotyn rebels to join the 45th Rifle Division in June 1919—thus effectively contributing to the destruction of Ukrainian independence. Even under these circumstances, UNR spies, who remained active in Podolia as it fell to the Soviets, reported that the population of Hotin County remained anti-Russian, whereas "the majority of Bessarabia's population" was won over by communism. The latter claim is partly backed by records of both the Siguranța and the Whites, though these suggest that Bessarabians were generally pro-Russian, rather than specifically Bolshevik.

Historian Mitru Ghițiu proposes that any Moldovan resistance to communism was casually silenced by Soviet writers: "the issue was never even up for discussion, with authorities fearing that any glimpse of the truth could bring into question the Romanian's 'boundless joy' at being 'liberated' by the Bolsheviks." Soviet authors ignored all talk of contributions by the Whites and their Committee for the Salvation of Bessarabia. This connection had already been brought up in 1919 by Major McLaren. In their interviews with Romanian officials, both he and Gachikevich dismissed all accounts of Bolshevik agitation. During their stay in Khotyn, McLaren and Boxhall had resided with the Krupenskys. According to Stănescu, this was an additional proof of continuity between Russian loyalism and the rebels of 1919, over a shared agenda of "keeping these territories inside Russia, even if it were a Soviet Russia". Researchers of various backgrounds, including Șornikov and Ludmila Rotari, have returned focus on the rebellion's connection with Russian monarchism. According to Șornikov, the Whites and the communists had maintained the exact same policy on the Bessarabian question, seeing Khotyn as an integral component of Russia. Zhurari had unwittingly served Romanian interests by relocating to Tiraspol, instead of forming his unit in Bessarabia itself, but as Șornikov notes, had later built his force into one highly threatening for the Romanian grip on Bessarabia.
