= Cleante Davidoglu =

Romanian general

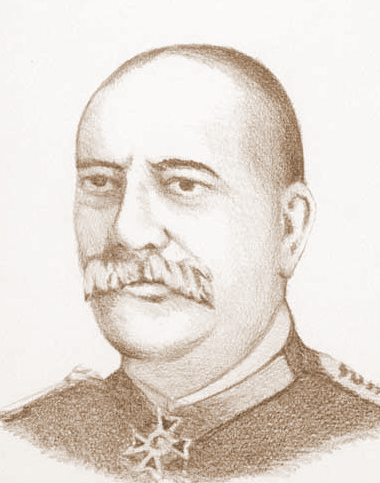
- General Cleante Davidoglu
- Born: 1871; Bârlad, Vaslui County, Kingdom of Romania
- Died: 1947 (aged 75–76); Bucharest, Kingdom of Romania
- Military career
- Allegiance: Romanian Army
- Branch: Infantry
- Rank: Major general
- Conflicts: World War I; Romanian Campaign; Khotyn Uprising; Hungarian–Romanian War
- Awards: Order of Michael the Brave, 3rd Class
- Other work: Commandant of Gendarmerie, 1927–1928

Cleante Davidoglu (1871–1947) was a Romanian major general during World War I and its immediate aftermath, who served as commander of the Gendarmerie from 1927 to 1928.

== Biography ==
=== Early life ===
He was born in Bârlad, Vaslui County, the son of Profira Moțoc and Doctor Cleante Davidoglu. His younger brother was the mathematician Anton Davidoglu. His grandfather was a salep seller, his great-grandfather a sipahi in the Ottoman Army, and his great-great-grandfather a janissary from around Piatra Neamț.

=== World War I ===
After his military studies, he was promoted to captain in 1905, and then served with the Romanian Army in World War I. During the Romanian Campaign of 1916, lieutenant colonel Davidoglu commanded the 4th Roșiori Regiment at the battles of Transylvania, Oituz, and Robănești. In 1917 he was promoted to colonel, and by the end of the war to brigadier general.

=== Hotin uprising ===
In October 1918, Prime Minister Alexandru Marghiloman ordered the Romanian Army to take control of Bukovina and Hotin, in the far-northern tip of Bessarabia. The 1st Cavalry Division soon moved into the region; it was spearheaded by the 3rd Redcoats Regiment and the 40th Infantry Regiment, both of which were placed under the command of General Davidoglu. Hotin was ceded by the Austrians on November 10, but on January 7, 1919, the Hotin Uprising, a Ukrainian-led insurrection, began. On January 19 Podolian irregulars crossed into Hotin County at Atachi, disarming Romanian border guards and moving in on Soroca; on January 23, after reaching Secureni, rebellion erupted in Hotin itself, chasing out the Romanian garrison. Soon after, Davidoglu's troops were joined by various units, including the 37th Infantry Regiment from Bacău and the machine-gunners of Bălți. On January 28–30, the regrouped units forced the rebels out the area, pushing them back over the Dniester by February 1.

=== The Hungarian–Romanian War ===
In March 1919 he was stationed in Satu Mare, where he helped Doctor Lükő Béla establish the surgery section of the city's hospital. In April 2019, during the Hungarian–Romanian War, he led the 2nd Roșiori Brigade in the battles around Satu Mare and Mátészalka. For the bravery he displayed in those engagements, Davidoglu was awarded on June 6 the Order of Michael the Brave, 3rd class.

=== The Gendarmerie ===
Promoted to major general, he served as commander of the Gendarmerie from 1927 to 1928. In July 1927, Iuliu Maniu and Virgil Madgearu, representing the National Peasants' Party, wrote an open letter to Prime Minister Ion I. C. Brătianu, the leader of the National Liberal Party, protesting Davidoglu's alleged interference in the 1927 Romanian general election.

Davidoglu subsequently served as Chief Gendarmerie Inspector of Mehedinți County. He died in Bucharest in 1947.

In 2012 the office of Gendarmerie Inspector of Mehedinți County was named in his honor.
