= Clișcăuți =

Clişcăuţi may refer to several places in Moldova:

- Clişcăuţi, a village in Hincăuţi Commune, Edineţ district
- Clişcăuţi, a village in Prepeliţa Commune, Sîngerei district

and to:

- Clișcăuți, the Romanian name for Klishkivtsi, Chernivtsi Oblast, Ukraine
