= Vorniceni =

Vorniceni may refer to:

- Vorniceni, Botoșani, a commune in Botoșani County, Romania
- Vorniceni, Strășeni, a commune in Strășeni district, Moldova
- Vorniceni, the Romanian name for Vornychany, Chernivtsi Oblast, Ukraine
