= Balasinești =

- Village
- Location in Moldova
- Coordinates: 48°15′N 26°58′E
- Country: Moldova
- District: Briceni District

Population (2014 census)
  - Total: 2,269
- Time zone: UTC+2 (EET)
  - Summer (DST): UTC+3 (EEST)

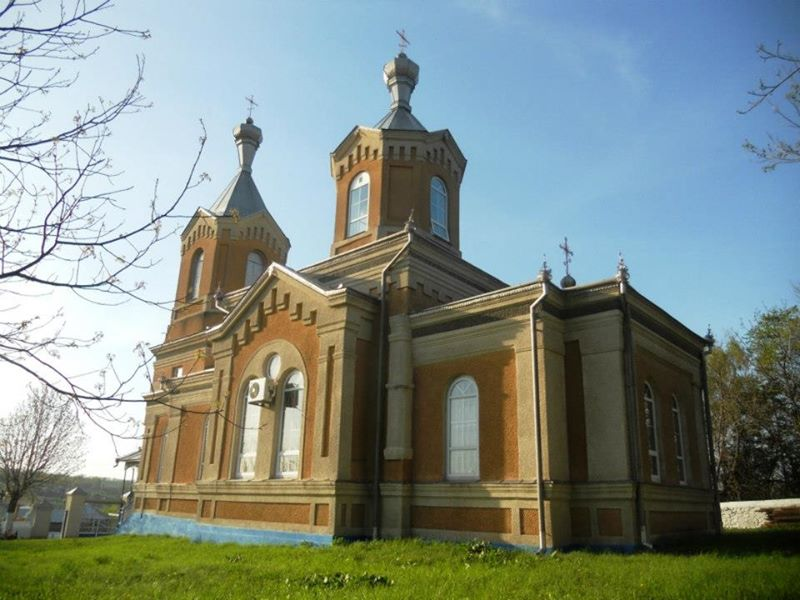

Balasinești is a village in Briceni District, Moldova.

== Notable people ==
- Nicolae Cernăuțeanu
