= Khotyn urban hromada =

Urban hromada in Chernivtsi Oblast, Ukraine

Coordinates: 48°26′N 26°30′E

Khotyn urban hromada Хотинська міська громада
- Hromada
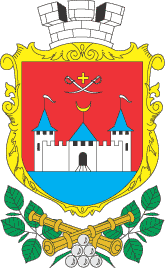
- Seal
- Interactive map of Khotyn urban hromada
- Country: Ukraine
- Oblast: Chernivtsi
- Raion: Dniester

Area
  - Total: 71.34 km^{2} (27.54 sq mi)

Population (2018)
  - Total: 11,454
  - Density: 160.6/km^{2} (415.8/sq mi)
- Settlements: 11
- Cities: 1
- Villages: 10

Khotyn urban territorial hromada (Ukrainian: Хотинська міська територіальна громада, romanized: Khotynska miska terytorialna hromada) is a hromada of Ukraine, located in the country's western Chernivtsi Oblast. Its capital is the city of Khotyn.

== Settlements ==
In addition to one city (Khotyn), there are 10 villages within the hromada:

- Anadoly
- Ataky
- Bilivtsi
- Dankivtsi
- Kaplivka
- Kruhlyk
- Krutenky
- Pashkivtsi
- Vornychany
- Yarivka
