= Anatole Romaniuk =

Ukrainian demographer (1924–2018)

Anatole Romaniuk (Romanian: Romaniuc, Ukrainian: Анатолій Романюк; 28 February 1924 – 5 March 2018) was a Ukrainian Canadian demographer who contributed to fertility and sterility, African demography, Aboriginal studies, demographic processes, and population forecasting. He played a key role in numerous population censuses, including the first population census in the Democratic Republic of Congo, several censuses in Canada from 1970 through to 1993, and the first census of independent Ukraine (2001).

== Early life and education ==
Anatole Romaniuk was born on 28 February 1924 in Zarozhany, currently Dniester Raion, Ukraine. Losing his father at age five in 1929, in 2009, he published a biography of him in Ukrainian. He was forced into exile at age 16 and lived in several countries, including Germany, Belgium, the Democratic Republic of Congo and the United States, before settling in Canada in 1964.

He pursued university studies at the University of Erlangen in Germany and the University of Leuven in Belgium where he earned a Ph.D. in Economics. He undertook post-graduate training at the INSEE (Institut National de la Statistique et des Études Économiques) in Paris, and holds a certificate in Demography from Princeton University.

== Career ==
He began his career as a demographer in the Belgian Congo, as Chief of the Demography Bureau (1953–1961), where he led the first population census in that country. With the independence of the Democratic Republic of Congo he joined the University of Kinshasa as a researcher while continuing to serve the Congolese Central Government in his capacity as adviser on population to the Minister of Planning and Economic Coordination. He was Research Associate at the Office of Population Research, Princeton University from 1961 to 1964. While at Princeton, he participated in the African Demographic Project which resulted in a major collective book, The Demography of Tropical Africa (Brass et al., Princeton University Press, 1968). Two men played a key role in the advancement of his earlier career: Leon H. Dupriez, the renowned Belgian economist, Professor at the Catholic University of Louvain and Ansley J. Coale, the foremost American demographer and long-term director of the Office of Population Research at Princeton University.

In Canada, he pursued an academic career as Professor at the University of Ottawa and the University of Montreal. He occupied senior positions at Statistics Canada (1968-1993), including as Director of the Demography Division. Upon his retirement in 1993, he joined the University of Alberta as Adjunct Professor where, until 2014, he was pursuing research in the field of population studies.

He was Fellow of the US Population Council (1961–62), President of the Federation of Canadian Demographers and a longstanding member of the International Union for the Scientific Study of Population. He was honored for "his many contributions to international and Canadian demography" with a special issue of the Canadian Studies in Population.

== Contribution to population studies ==
Romaniuk has written extensively in the areas of substantive, methodological and theoretical demography as well as in political demography. His work has made significant contributions to the literature on human population, fertility in Africa, particularly in the Democratic Republic of Congo and the demography of Canada's Aboriginal peoples. He is best known for his studies of human sterility in what was known as the "sterility belt" in central Africa

In technical demography, his contributions are in population estimates and projections, and in the application of non-conventional estimation methods in developing countries.

In the realm of theoretical demography, some of his work has helped to expand the literature on the theory of demographic transition in connection with the dynamics of fertility changes during the early stages of societal modernization as well as in connection with the emergence of a post-transitional demographic regime, what he calls the regime of demographic maturity. He has also contributed to the epistemology of forecasting. With regard to population policies, he advocates for a stationary population.

=== Substantive demography ===
Of particular interest to demographers are his writings regarding Sub-Saharan Africa on the colonial demography of the Congo, the current state of fertility in Africa and the emerging fertility patterns in African urban agglomerations.

The earlier period of Belgian colonial rule in the Congo was dominated by concerns of depopulation believed to be brought by an excessive mortality due to the exploitation of native populations in mercantile pursuits (rubber extraction, in particular) as well as to new infections, introduced by the coloniser, all the more lethal as natives lacked natural immunity. This was the version of depopulation of post-Colombian America. Some Western authors went so far as to speak of genocide being perpetrated during the Belgian colonial rule under Leopold II's reign (losses of 10 million population are being cited). Romaniuk makes a strong case of depopulation by widespread sterility caused by venereal diseases. Remarkably, the zone of massive sterility coincides geographically, grosso modo, with the regions in central and North-East of the Congo devastated by Afro-Arab slavery campaigns in the second half of the 19th century. These regions have since recovered demographically; excessive sterility has practically disappeared. This seems to be due to anti-venereal campaigns, growing public awareness of the sexually transmitted diseases, and possibly due to the degeneration of the venereal germs as they evolve from the epidemic to endemic states (typical case for syphilis).

In most of Sub-Saharan Africa, fertility remains high even today. Under the prevailing conditions of persistent precarious economic conditions and social insecurity, Romaniuk argues, the nuclear family is not an alternative to the extended kinship with its deep-seated sense of solidarity and lineage. Moved by culture and atavism, and no less by economic rationality, the belief regarding the benefits of numerous progeny for security continues to prevail, although procreative patterns are moderate to optimise the chances of coping with the challenges of modernity.

Since he moved to Canada in 1964, Romaniuk took a particular interest in the demography of Aboriginal peoples. According to Romaniuk, in the four centuries since the Europeans first set foot in the country, the demography of the Aboriginal peoples has taken dramatic twists, from near extinction, due primarily to the epidemics brought by Europeans to which they lacked immunity, to impressive demographic recovery. However, their resilience against superior forces, their vitality to recover under the most adverse of conditions, should not blind us from recognising, he argues, the inherent vulnerability of a minority, which is numerically weaker, fragmented, and widely dispersed, still contending with many attributes of an underprivileged class of people.

=== Theoretical demography ===
Of significance are his contributions to the theory of the onset of the demographic (fertility) transition and post-transitional demographic regime.

It is generally assumed that modernisation brings with it fertility decline. This is true generally but not necessarily at its earliest stages. In traditional, pre-modern society, a host of biological and cultural factors, such as protracted lactation, prolonged post-partum sexual abstinence, malnutrition and infections-induced sterility kept fertility well below the potential. With modernisation, these fertility-depressing factors are weakened or removed all together. Yet, birth control had not reached the critical level to counter these modernisation-associated factors - hence the rise in fertility. Evidence from African populations and North American Aboriginals support the thesis.

As to the post-transitional demographic stages, according to Romaniuk, nations of western civilisation in particular, have entered what he calls demographic maturity. Living longer and healthier while at the same time reproducing less and less are its two major correlates. Generational sub-replacement fertility, advanced aging and population implosion are its inherent features. To manage the emerging demographic regime new ways of thinking about population and innovative policy approaches are called for, according to him.

=== Methodology ===
Much of Romaniuk's work was methodological. During his tenure with the Princeton African Project, he endeavoured to develop ways of deriving basic population parameters from incomplete data. The so-called Brass method to derive fertility and mortality parameters for the history of mothers' ever born and surviving children, and the stable population models developed by Ansley Coale and Paul Demeny at Princeton University figured prominently in this endeavour. During his tenure at the Canada Federal Bureau of Statistics, he endeavoured to develop methods for population estimation. His particular interest was in population forecasting methodology. According to him, one must balance parsimony with efficiency, minimise the input and maximise the projection output, by selecting a limited numbers of parameters with inherent analytical capacity. The credibility of forecasting rests largely on the analytical quality of the assumptions underlying projections.

=== Political demography ===
At the mature stages of his intellectual life, he came to take particular interest in population policies. Inspired by the classical economist John Stuart Mill, he advocates for stationary population as an optimal response to the quest for ecological and economic sustainability, national identity, social cohesion and world peace. Western democracies, in particular, are faced with a unique set of challenges arising out of the prevailing imbalance between fertility and immigration. Hence, in order to actualize the benefits of a stationary demographic configuration, they need to raise their fertility to the generational replacement level. In respect to the doctrinal debates, the virtue of the stationary population is that it cuts across ecologists' long-term concerns and economists' short term concerns.

Romaniuk's outlook of the Western European civilization is rather pessimistic, Spenglerian. Under the guise of multiculturalism, new "instant, artificial societies" are erected, purely based on formal citizenship, thus superseding the notion of the historical nation taking centuries to evolve into a nationally conscious community of peoples. Europe of the 20th century had a disastrous record of failed attempts to create instantaneously man-made new types of societies, inspired by either classless society or racist ideologies. While singling out national identity as an issue, no intent is implied therein of elevating nationhood to the sacrosanct to be forever locked and frozen in time. Nor would he suggest closing the gates to the transnational movement of people. Not all is wrong with multiculturalism, he argues. Respect for another's culture is a virtue in itself. Diasporas, in many cases, can play a positive role in interstate relations, and in mutual enrichment through cross-fertilisation. The matter is not all-or-nothing, but that of moderation. It all boils down to the question of what the French humanist, writer and philosopher, Albert Camus, encapsulated in two words: "mesure et démesure".

Romaniuk's book, Fertility in Canada: from Baby Boom to Baby Bust, published by Statistics Canada in 1984, deserves to be singled out for it stirred wide public debate on the future of Canada, and brought successive governments to adopt policies, particularly about immigration, to counter potential population implosion. Scholars in their many reviews praised the book for its scholarship. Demographer Karol Krotki wrote in his review: "It is not often that works of this kind come out of a government department," "The volume brings credit to Statistics Canada and to its author…," wrote, Richard W. Osborn, from the Department of Preventive Medicine and Biostatistics of University of Toronto "Probably, all that can be said in the way of scenario for the future is that the prevailing regime among industrialized nations will be one of low and unstable fertility", wrote Frank Trovato, whereas another Canadian demographer, Roderic Beaujot, echoes the book's view that "procreative behaviour may be more a matter of mores than of economics".

Newspaper editorials, at the time, sounded outright alarmist. The House of Common debated vigorously the question as well But, rather than boosting fertility through effective family support measures, successive Canadian governments resorted since to large-scale immigration in order to sustain population growth.

== Awards and honours ==
- Canadian Population Society Award for his contribution to Canadian demography and the disciple of population studies.
- Special Issue of Canadian Studies in Population (Vol. 20, No 1, 2003), "in tribute to Anatole Romaniuc for his many contributions to international and Canadian demography from his many colleagues and friends".
- Award by the President of Ukraine for the contribution to the 2001Census of population of Ukraine.
- Honorary Statistician of the Ukrainian Bureau of Statistics, made in 2008.
- Honorary Citizen of the district of Khotyn, the native region of the recipient.
- Fellow of the Population Council (U.S.A.), 1961–62.
- L'Etoile de service en argent en récompense de bons et loyaux services, par arrêté royal du 5 décembre 1959, (distinction for achievements in the D.R. of Congo).

== Personal life ==
A string of personal tragedies and political upheavals in Central and Eastern Europe affected his childhood and early youth. His father, Ivan (Vania) Romaniuk, a veteran of the Russian Imperial Army during the First World War on the Eastern front and a public figure in his native province, Bessarabia (formerly part of the Russian Empire and Romania between 1919 and 1940), was elected Deputy to the Parliament of Romania in Bucharest in 1925. He died in 1929 at the age of 37 from ailments he suffered during the war, leaving his young wife widowed with two small children, aged three and five.

The invasion of his native Bessarabia by the Soviets in 1940 brought with it massive deportations to Siberia. His mother and her two children were also targeted to be deported but managed to escape, only to be forced out of the country. They ended up in Germany, which his mother and sister escaped a year later. Her son's attempt to escape landed him in prison in Berlin in 1942 (Alexander Platz Gefängnis). Eventually, he managed to escape to Przemyśl, Poland. There, he enrolled as clandestine student in a Ukrainian high school, which he successfully completed in 1944. He escaped the advance of the Soviet army to Slovakia and later to Austria where he was again arrested by the Gestapo and imprisoned in Vienna. He miraculously escaped shortly before Vienna was taken over by the Soviet army. He witnessed the collapse of Nazi Germany in Munich in May 1945. Separated from his widowed mother and sister during the war, it took fifteen years of searching to locate and reconnect with them in Bucharest, Romania, where they had settled.

He kept active all through his life, his last academic work coming out a few months before his death.

He died at home in Ottawa, Ontario after a brief pneumonia. He was 94 and survived by his wife Maria, a son, and a daughter.

== Bibliography ==
=== Scholarly monographs and edited collections ===
- Romaniuk, A. 2014. Aboriginal Populations: Social, Demographic and Epidemiological Perspectives, contributor and co-editor with Frank Trovato, Alberta University Press.
- Romaniuk, A. 2006. La démographie congolaise au milieu du XXe siècle, Presses Universitaires de Louvain.
- Romaniuk, A. 1984. Fertility in Canada: From Baby-boom to Baby-bust, Statistics Canada, Ottawa.
- Romaniuk, A. 1987. Population Estimation Methods (Editor and contributor), Statistics Canada, Ottawa.
- Romaniuk A. 1975. (Jointly with Gnanasekaran, Perreault, Vanasse-Duhamel). Technical Report on Population Projections for Canada and the Provinces, Statistics Canada, 1975.
- Romaniuk, A. 1968. La fécondité des populations congolaises, Paris: Mouton.
- Romaniuk, A. (with Brass, Coale, Demeny, Heisel, Lorimer, van de Walle). 1968. The Demography of Tropical Africa, Princeton University Press.

=== (Auto)biographical books ===
- Romaniuk, A. (Editor). 2014. Deportation to Siberia: Memoires in Russian by Maria Antonov (born Yavorska).
- Romaniuk, A. 2009. Biography of Ivan Onufriyovych Romaniuk. (In Ukrainian).
- Romaniuk, A. 2009. Le Congo de ma jeunesse, souvenirs et réflexions d'un démographe. (In French) (The Congo of my Youth: Reminiscences and Reflections of a Demographer), Kinshasa.
- Romaniuk, A. 2006. Chronicles of a Life: Reminiscences and Thoughts Tied to History, autobiographical, (In Ukrainian).
