= Ion Ignatiuc =

Bessarabian politician (1893–1943)

Member of the Moldovan Parliament
- In office 1917–1918

Personal details
- Born: 15 February 1893 Prepeliţa
- Died: 23 January 1943 (aged 49) Tatar Autonomous Soviet Socialist Republic

Ion Ignatiuc (15 February 1893, Prepeliţa - 23 January 1943) was a Bessarabian politician.

== Biography ==
He served as Member of the Moldovan Parliament (1917–1918).

== Gallery ==
Moldovan stamp, 1998

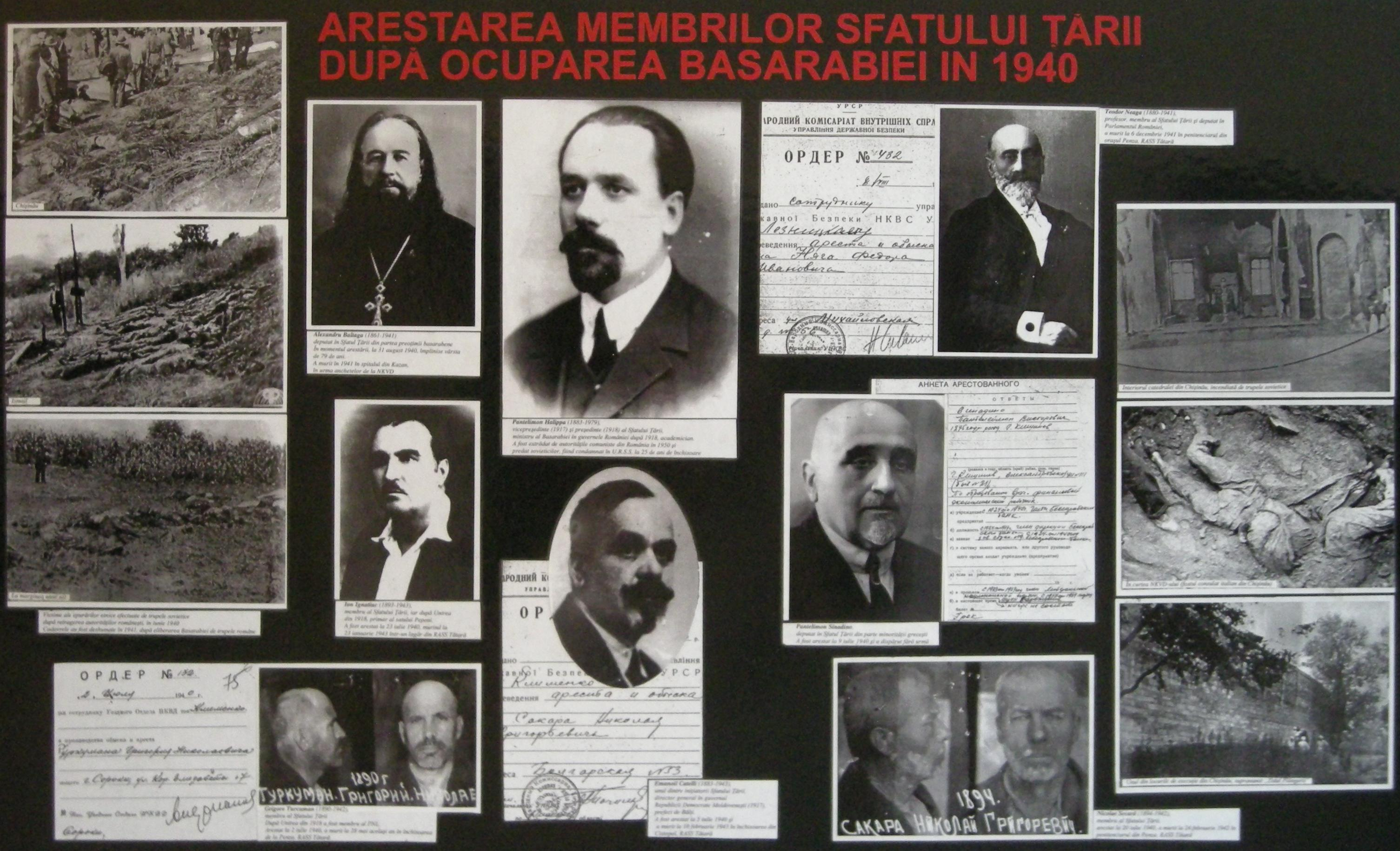
Persecutions against Sfatul Țării members
