= Anton Davidoglu =

Romanian mathematician (1876–1958)

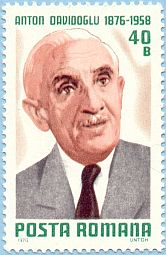
Postage stamp featuring Davidoglu

Anton Davidoglu (June 30, 1876 – May 27, 1958) was a Romanian mathematician who specialized in differential equations.

He was born in 1876 in Bârlad, Vaslui County, the son of Profira Moțoc and Doctor Cleante Davidoglu. His older brother was General Cleante Davidoglu.

He studied under Jacques Hadamard at the École Normale Supérieure in Paris, defending his Ph.D. dissertation in 1900. His thesis — the first mathematical investigation of deformable solids — applied Émile Picard's method of successive approximations to the study of fourth order differential equations that model traverse vibrations of non-homogeneous elastic bars.

After returning to Romania, Davidoglu became a professor at the University of Bucharest. In 1913, he was founding rector of the Academy of High Commercial and Industrial Studies in Bucharest. He also continued to teach at the University of Bucharest, until his retirement in 1941.

Davidoglu was a founding member of the Romanian Academy of Sciences, and was featured on a 1976 Romanian postage stamp. He died in 1958 in Bucharest.

== Publications ==
- Davidoglu, Anton (1900). "Sur l'équation des vibrations transversales des verges élastiques" (PDF). Annales Scientifiques de l'École Normale Supérieure. 3rd ser. 17. Paris: 359–444. doi:10.24033/asens.484. JFM 31.0769.01.
- Davidoglu, Anton (1900). "Sur une application de la méthode des approximations successives". Comptes rendus de l'Académie des Sciences. 130: 1241–1243. JFM 31.0353.02.
- Davidoglu, Anton (1905). "Étude de l'équation différentielle $\frac{d^2 \left[ \theta (x) \frac{d^2y}{dx^2} \right]}{dx^2} =k \varphi(x) y$" (PDF). Annales Scientifiques de l'École Normale Supérieure. 3rd ser. 22. Paris: 539–565. doi:10.24033/asens.560. JFM 36.0399.02.
- Davidoglu, Anton (1936). "Sur une équation des mouvements turbulents". C. R. Acad. Sci. Roumanie (in French). 1: 3–7. JFM 62.1272.02.
