= Zarozhany =

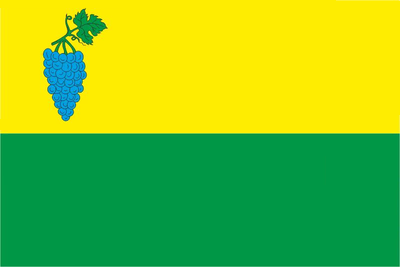
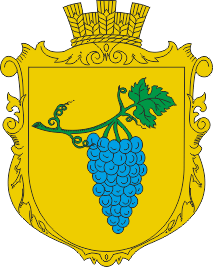
- Flag Coat of arms
- Interactive map of Zarozhany
- Coordinates: 48°24′45″N 26°17′19″E
- Country: Ukraine
- Oblast: Chernivtsi Oblast
- Raion: Dniester Raion
- Hromada: Nedoboivtsi rural hromada
- First written mention: 1672
- Elevation: 203 m (666 ft)

Population (01.01.2026)
  - Total: 2,572
- Postal code: 60034

Zarozhany (Ukrainian: Зарожани; Romanian: Zarojani) is a commune (selsoviet) in Dniester Raion, Chernivtsi Oblast, Ukraine. It belongs to Nedoboivtsi rural hromada, one of the hromadas of Ukraine.

Until 18 July 2020, Zarozhany belonged to Khotyn Raion. The raion was abolished in July 2020 as part of the administrative reform of Ukraine, which reduced the number of raions of Chernivtsi Oblast to three. The area of Khotyn Raion was merged into Dniester Raion.

== Notable people ==
- Anatole Romaniuk (1924–2018), demographer
