= Oleksandr Valentynovych Potylchak =

Ukrainian historian (born 1965)

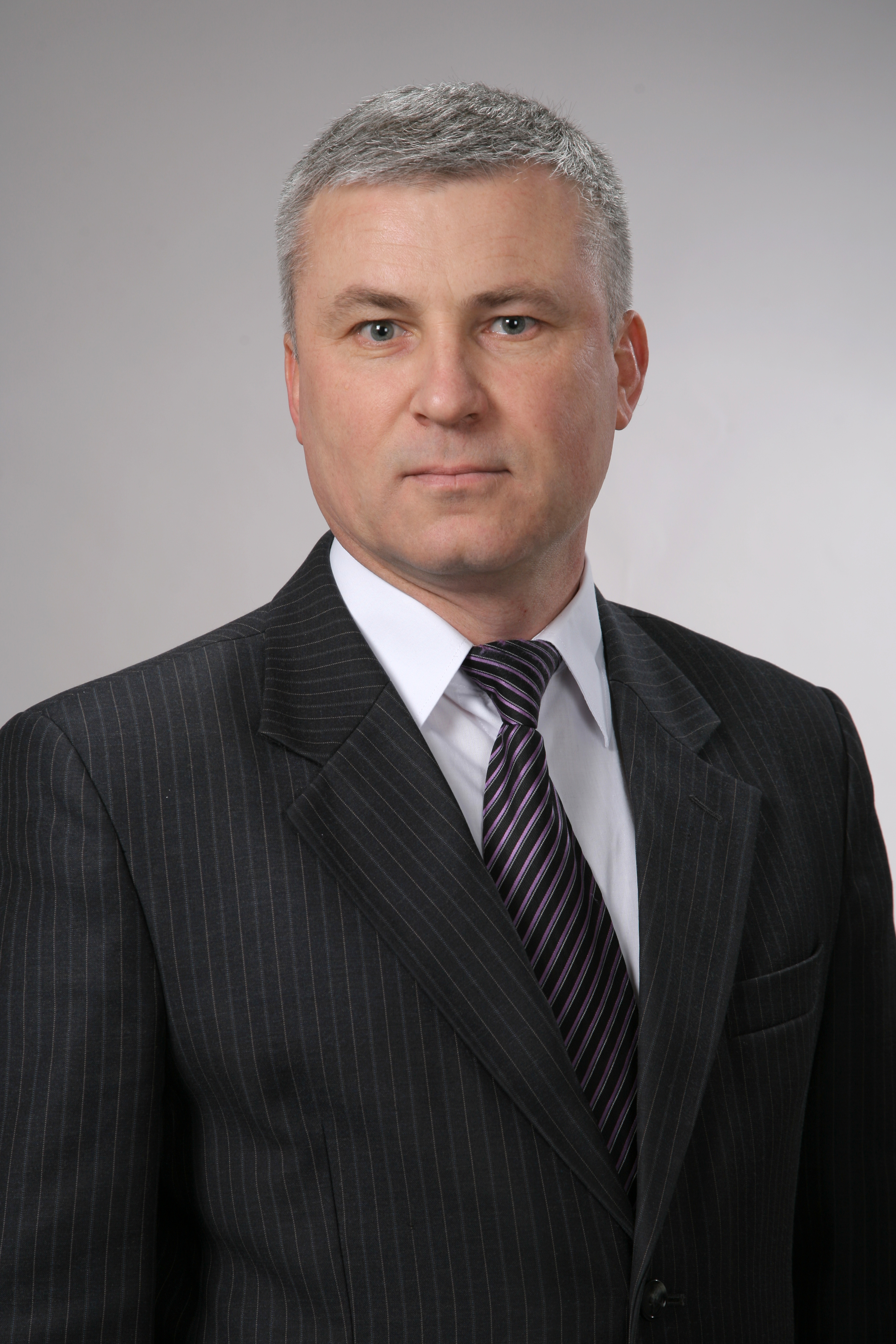
- Born: July 7, 1965 (age 61)
- Education: Kiev Pedagogical Institute named after O.M. Gorky (now – National Pedagogical Dragomanov University)
- Scientific career
- Fields: History

Oleksandr Valentynovych Potylchak (Ukrainian: Олександр Валентинович Потильчак) is a researcher of Ukrainian history during World War II and the postwar period. He holds a doctoral degree of historical science (since 2006).

== Biography ==
Potylchak was born on July 7, 1965, in the family of worker and white-collar worker in the village Lytvynivka of Kyivo-Sviatoshynskyi (now – Vyshgorodskiy) district of Kyiv Region. He graduated at Technical College-4 in Bila Tserkva (1984) and worked as a locksmith of test equipment and automatics for Hostomel Glass Plant (Kiev region). Potylchak did his military service in the Armed Forces of the USSR (1984–1986).

He studied at the historical faculty of the Kiev Pedagogical Institute named after O.M. Gorky (1986–1991), and graduated it with honours.

Potylchak worked for National Pedagogical Dragomanov University as a senior laboratory assistant (1991), a graduate teaching assistant (1992), a senior lecturer of department of History of Slavs and Ethnology (1994), a docent of department of History of Slavs and Ethnology (2000 – 2001 and 2004 – 2005).

Since September 2006 Potylchak has been working as the head of department of Source Studies and Special Historical Disciplines of the Institute of History Education of National Pedagogical Dragomanov University, where he has been teaching teaches courses: Theoretical and Practical Museology, History of Philately, Expertise of the Cultural and Historical Values, and Historical Source Study.

== Scientific activities ==
In 1999 he defended his PhD thesis Human Resources Exploitation Ukraine during the Nazi Germany occupation at the Institute of History of Ukraine of the National Academy of Sciences of Ukraine (NAS).

In 2005, at the Institute of History of Ukraine, he defended his doctoral thesis The Soviet regime institutions for war prisoners and internees in the USSR (1939–1954): organization, deployment, structure.

Potylchak is a member of the Special Council for thesis defences (D 26.053.02) at the National Pedagogical Dragomanov University; an associate editor of the scientific publications: It is not a secret any more and Military-Historical Almanac of State Committee of Archives of Ukraine; Ukraine. The Second World War 1939–1945 of Institute of History of Ukraine (NAS Ukraine); and a member of the All-Ukrainian public organization Institute of Military History.

Research interests of Potylchak include the history of the Soviet special services, military and socio-political history of Ukraine during the Second World War and the post-war period. The main problematic of researches involves the Nazi occupation regime in Ukraine (1941–1944), the organization and functioning of the institutions of the Soviet military captivity in Ukrainian SSR (1939–1954). Potylchak is an author of more than 120 scientific and methodological papers.

Main scientific works

- Economic collaboration in Ukraine during the Nazi occupation (1941–1944): causes and results;
- Professional-training and education of labour reserves in Ukraine during the Nazi occupation (1941–1944): policy and practice of aggressor;
- Labour resources of the Soviet war prisoners and "Ostarbeiteren" from Ukraine in the Nazi war economy during World War II;
- "New Order" in occupied Ukraine (1941–1944);
- The attitude of the population of Ukraine towards German war prisoners (1944–1945);
- Internment of foreign citizens to the territory of Ukraine in 1945;
- Soviet camps for war prisoners in Ukraine (1939–1954): organizational and structural aspects;
- Burial of foreign war prisoners and internees of World War II in Ukraine;
- Soviet war captivity and internment in Ukraine (1939–1954);
- Nazi policy on training specialists with secondary and higher specialized education in Ukraine;
- Ukraine 1941–1944: the tragedy of the nation behind the facade of the Holy War;
- Secrets of the "Western internment": Japanese in Soviet POW camps in the Ukrainian SSR (1946–1949);
- Ukrainian civil labour resources and the system of forced labour during the German occupation.
