= Nicolae Cernăuțeanu =

Bessarabian politician

Member of Sfatul Țării
- In office 1917–1918

Personal details
- Born: Balasinești, Bessarabia Governorate

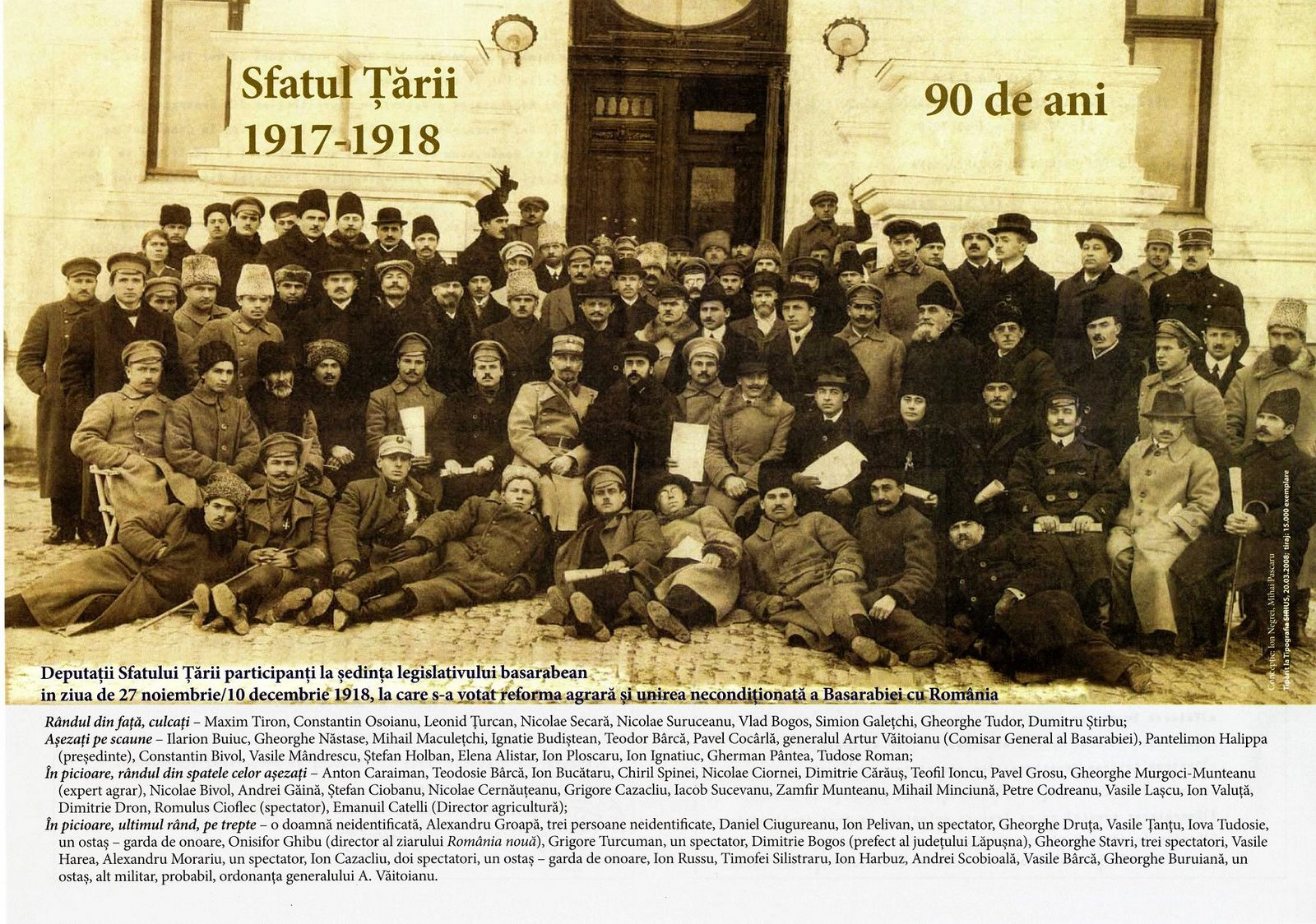
Sfatul Țării, December 10, 1918. Cernăuțeanu is on the top row, sixth from the left.

Nicolae Cernăuțeanu (born 1892 in Balasinești) was a Bessarabian politician. He served as Member of Sfatul Țării (the Parliament of Bessarabia) in 1917–1918. He voted for the Union of Bessarabia with Romania.
