= Prepelița =

- Commune
- Location in Moldova
- Coordinates: 47°35′N 28°20′E
- Country: Moldova
- District: Sîngerei District

Population (2014)
  - Total: 3,372
- Time zone: UTC+2 (EET)
  - Summer (DST): UTC+3 (EEST)

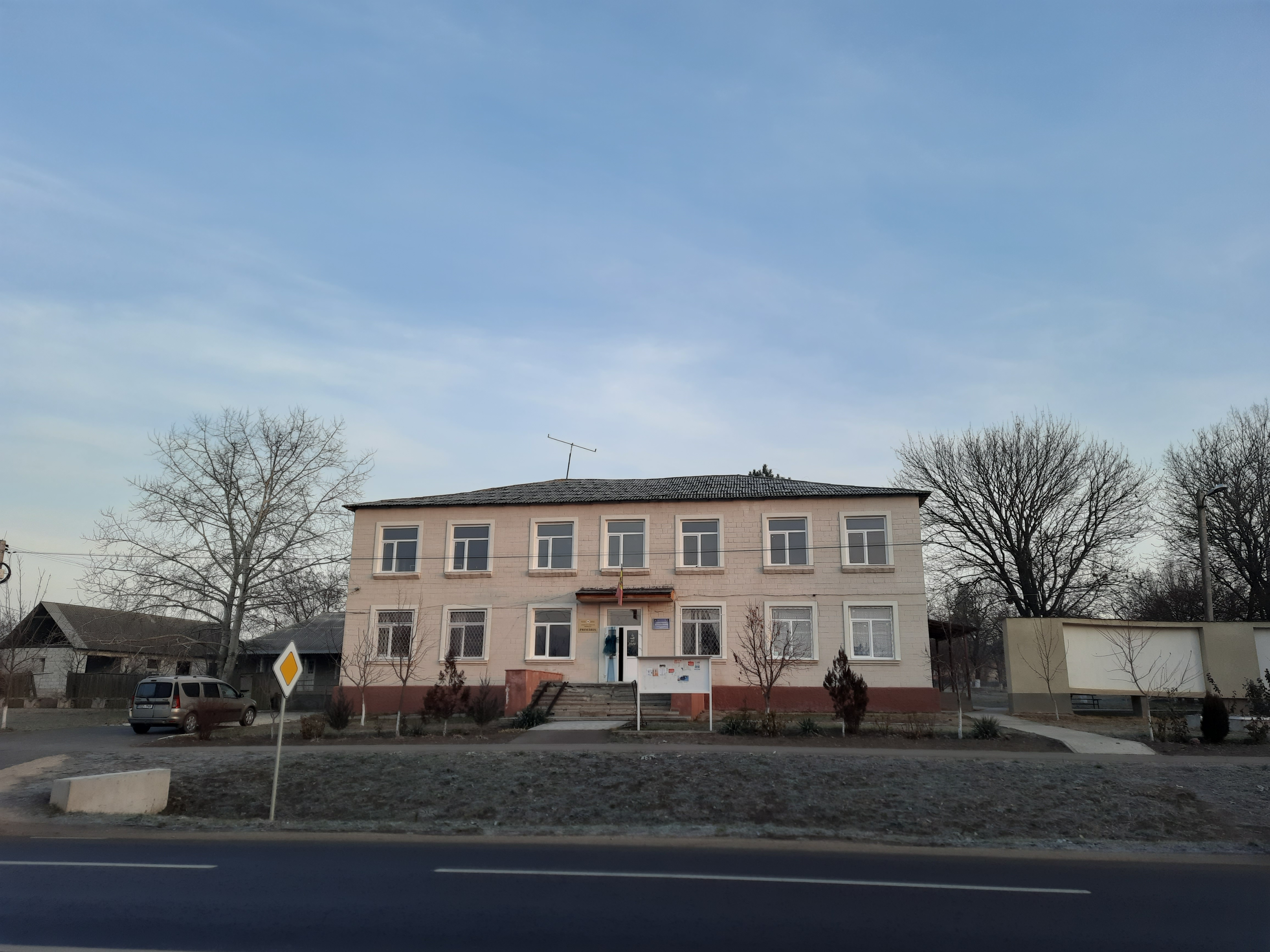
MD.SG.Prepelita - town hall

Prepelița is a commune in Sîngerei District, Moldova. It is composed of four villages: Clișcăuți, Mihailovca, Prepelița and Șestaci.

== Notable people ==
- Ion Ignatiuc
