= Hincăuți =

- Commune
- Location within Edineț
- Coordinates: 48°16′21″N 27°18′27″E
- Country: Moldova
- District: Edineț District
- Elevation: 225 m (738 ft)

Population (2014)
  - Total: 1,492
- Time zone: UTC+2 (EET)
  - Summer (DST): UTC+3 (EEST)
- Postal code: MD-4633

Hincăuţi is a commune in Edineţ district, Moldova. It is composed of three villages: Clişcăuţi, Hincăuţi and Poiana.
