= Roșiori (military unit) =

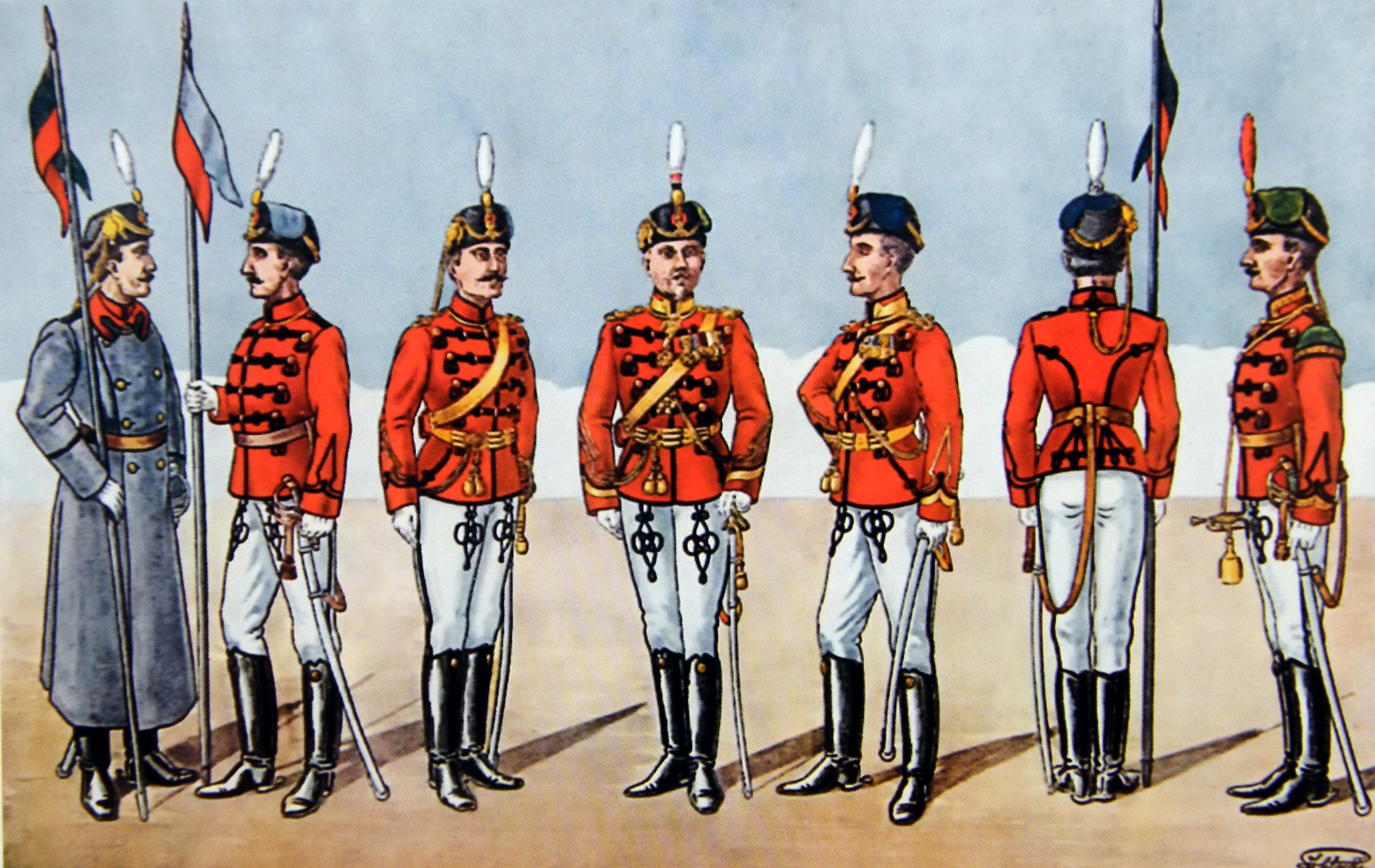
- 1930 drawing of cavalrymen wearing the distinctive red uniform of the Roșiori, 1890s model
- Country: Kingdom of Romania
- Role: Cavalry
- Nickname(s): "Red Hussars"

The Roșiori were a type of cavalry unit in the Romanian Army. Active throughout the late 19th and early 20th centuries, the Roșiori were known for their vibrant red uniforms.

== History ==
The Roșiori were formed in 1868 during a period of modernization within the Romanian army. The result of these reforms was the formation of an irregular cavalry force (described in one source as being armed like Cossacks), the Călărași, and a professional cavalry force, the Roșiori, who were armed and organized along the lines of the cavalry of the German Empire. The Roșiori wore scarlet hussar uniforms, white pantaloons, and white belts; some sources describe the units as the "Red Hussars".

By 1908, the Romanian army had elected to split the army's professional cavalry forces into hussar and lancer regiments. As part of this division, the Roșiori were re-organized as lancers, and formed six of the Romanian army's seventeen cavalry regiments. The Roșiori were full-time soldiers, and maintained their distinctive red uniforms. Roșiori regiments were made up of five squadrons (four of which were professional, one of which was irregular), with each squadron consisting of 174 horsemen.

In 1912, uniforms of one color and cut for the whole army were introduced, initially only as campaign outfits: green-gray color, with patches, piping and stripes of distinctive color, and the regimental number was worn on the headdress and epaulettes. Compared to the infantry, the Roșiori wore gray-black pants, and since 1916, green-gray (during the war both models were worn). They also wore black leather boots, with spurs. During the war, knee-high boots or leggings of the same size were also used.

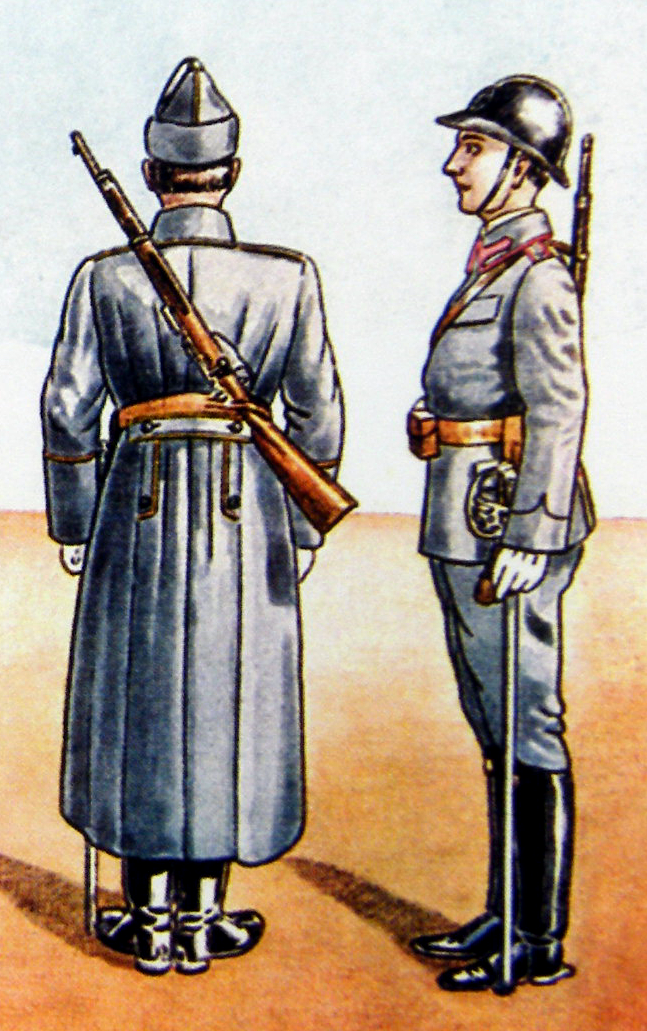
Uniforms of the 9th and 1st Roșiori Regiments during World War I

The regiment color, present on patches and piping was:

- Yellow - 1st Regiment;
- White - 2nd Regiment;
- Green - 3rd Regiment;
- Light blue - 4th Regiment;
- Light green - 5th Regiment;
- Dark blue - 6th Regiment;
- Brown - 7th Regiment;
- Purple - 8th Regiment;
- Pink - 9th Regiment;
- Gray - 10th Regiment
- Dark red (brick color) - 11th Regiment.

During World War I, the Roșiori regiments served with distinction in campaigns against Austria-Hungary, the Kingdom of Bulgaria, and the German Empire. The conflict also saw the mobilization of dismounted Roșiori regiments.

Following the Romania's joining of the Axis powers and subsequent entry into World War II, Roșiori regiments (which numbered 13 as of 1942) saw service on the Eastern Front against the Red Army.

== List of Roșiori regiments ==
- 1st Roșiori regiment
- 2nd Roșiori regiment - Distinguished itself at the Battle of Prunaru, where it was nearly destroyed.
- 3rd Roșiori regiment
- 4th Roșiori regiment - associated with the Romanian royal family, and ceremonially led by Queen Marie of Romania. Part of the elite 2nd Roșiori brigade during World War I.
- 5th Roșiori regiment
- 6th Roșiori regiment - reformed as the 6th Motorized regiment during World War II.
- 7th Roșiori regiment - alleged to have committed war crimes against the Jewish population of Bessarabia, Northern Bukovina, and Transnistria during the Holocaust. Postwar investigations of the unit were first begun and then later suppressed by the Communist government of Romania.
- 8th Roșiori regiment
- 9th Roșiori regiment - part of the elite 2nd Roșiori brigade during World War I.
- 10th Roșiori regiment
- 11th Roșiori regiment
- 12th Roșiori regiment
- 13th Roșiori regiment
