= Franciscan Church, Brașov =

Church in Braşov, Romania

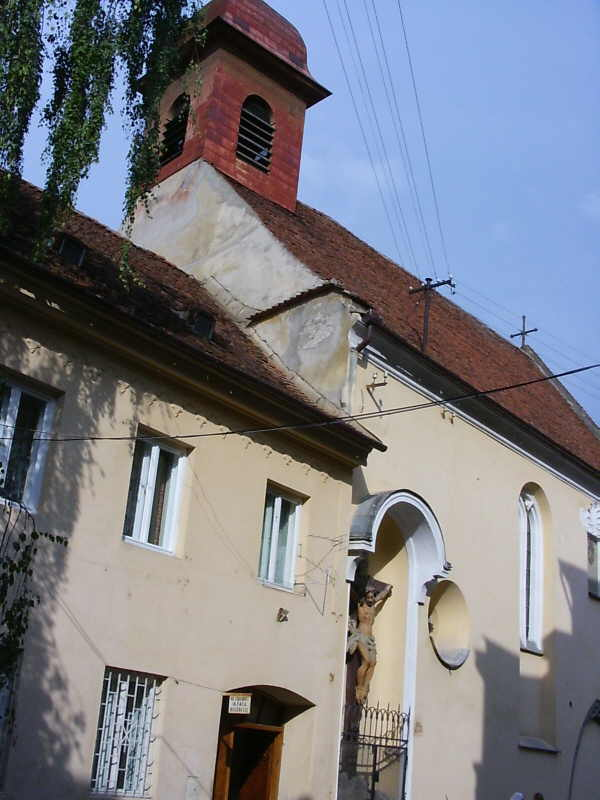
Franciscan Church

The Franciscan Church in Brașov, Romania, is situated in the old town of Brașov at 7 Sf. Ioan street. It was built in Gothic style and underwent numerous changes during the Renaissance and later in the Baroque period. The church has been in the current form since 1711, hence the dominant Baroque style. It is dedicated to Saint John the Baptist.

== History ==
There is no official document to state the exact date when the church was built but it is believed that it was erected around 1450. The church was founded by the nuns of the Order of Saint Clare, or the Clarisses, and the first written record dates from 1486. In 1543, as in the case of many other monasteries in Transylvania, the Lutherans expelled the order from town, and the whole church as well as the monastery was emptied and used as a granary until 1644 when it was restored to its initial status and was used as a Lutheran place of worship.

Along with the Austrian Royal Army, representatives of the Jesuit and Franciscan order made their entry to Brașov in 1686. In 1716 the Jesuit monks moved in but an extensive fire destroyed much of the edifice. In 1724 two generals in the Austrian army, Königsegg and Tige, contributed to the rebuilding of the church which was then handed over to the monks of the Franciscan order and inaugurated in 1725. The following years began the furnishing of the interior which, according to the customs of the time, was manufactured by talented members of the order. The next period saw further changes. In 1745 a chapel was attached to the southern side of the church in honour of St Anne. After a second devastating fire, some of the adjacent buildings became unusable and had to be demolished. That is where the sacristry was built in 1783.

== Features ==
The St John the Baptist Franciscan Church and Monastery is a complex of buildings with an L ground-plan and has the wooden bell-tower as its outstanding feature.

On the southern frontispiece of the nave there is a late Gothic walled-up archway from the 15th century above which stands a commemorative tablet from 1725 dedicated to the generous General Tige and his wife, bestowers of the church. A corridor leads to the western entrance of the church, but before the 1725 reconstruction on the north side there used to be another one with an adorned stone frame and a Renaissance bas-relief still visible today.

The interior features Baroque church furniture made in the late 1730s, with inlay so common in those days. The main altar dedicated to St John the Baptist is made up of three pieces. The central piece is an oil painting which represents St John baptising Jesus Christ in the River of Jordan with three Corinthian columns on each side. Above the altar there is a richly adorned gold medallion featuring the coat-of-arms of Ludwig Andreas Khevenhüller and his wife, patrons of the church, and a date (1729). On both sides of the interior arch stand the secondary altars dedicated to Virgin Mary and St John of Nepomuki copying the style of the central-piece. In place of the tabernacles the illustrations of the two patron saints of the order: St Francis of Assisi and St Antony of Padua are on display. The statues inside the Saint John Church dating from the turn of the 20th century illustrate the Stations of the Cross (1892), Our Lady of Lourdes (1890), Saint Anthony (1900), Saint Francis (1930), the Virgin Mary as well as Jesus Christ the Saviour.

The church organ was built in 1751, and rebuilt in 1939.

In the 20th century the St John the Baptist church underwent two major restoration repairs during which the artist, Hans Bulhardt, painted the interior in Neo-Baroque style and completed the fresco on the northern wall illustrating St Antony and the she-wolf. The second repairwork was performed following the 10thNovember 1940 earthquake which caused serious damage.

The church is listed as a historic monument by Romania's Ministry of Culture and Religious Affairs.

== Notes ==
- Kovács Zsolt: Szent János ferences templom, Brassó
- Léstyán Ferenc: Megszentelt kövek: A középkori erdélyi püspökség templomai I. 2. bőv. kiadás. Gyulafehérvár: Római Katolikus Érsekség. 2000. [[Speciális:Könyvforrások/9739203566|ISBN 9739203566]]
