= Saint George's Church, Brașov =

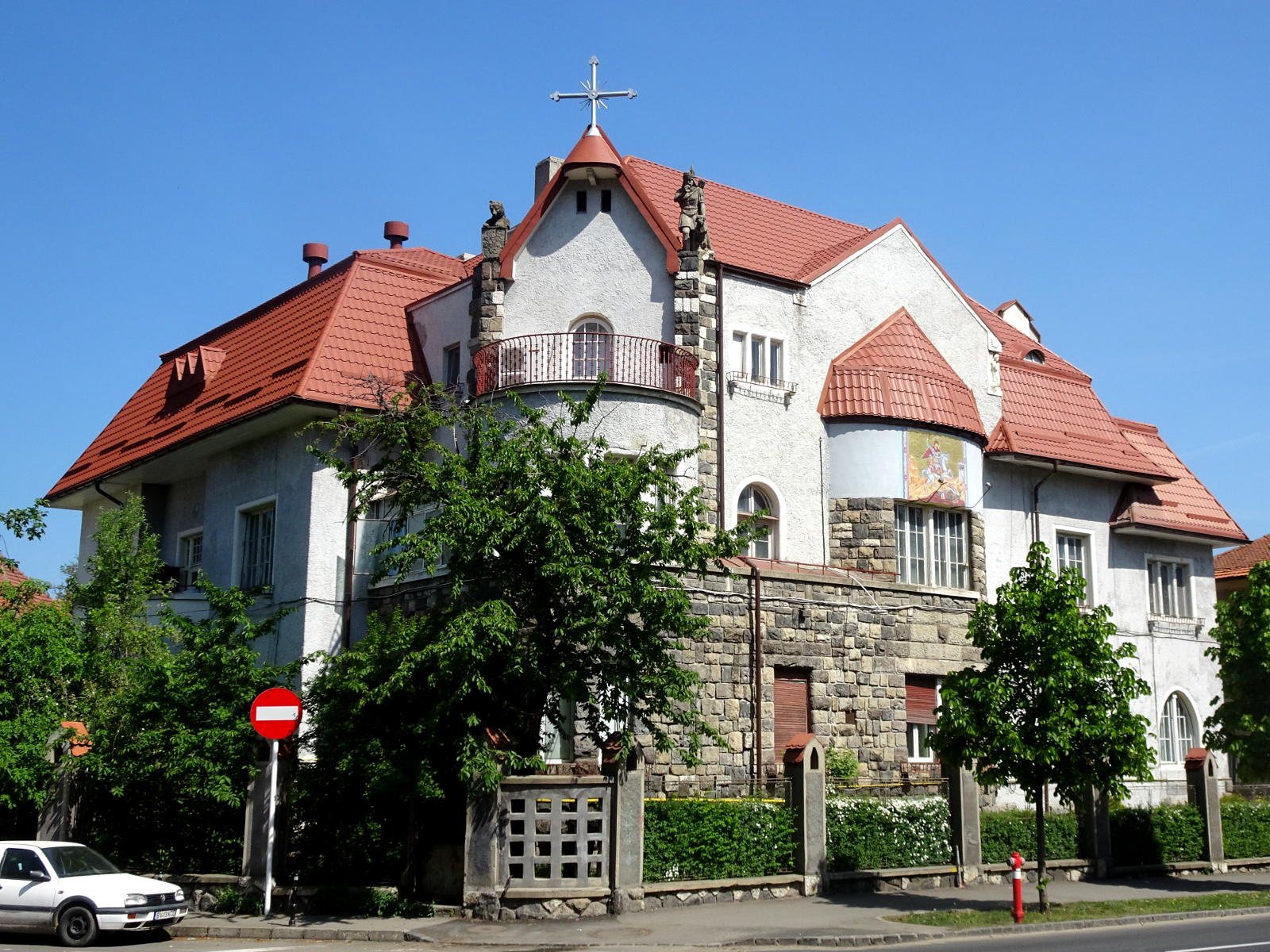
- Saint George's Church, Brașov
- 45°38′52″N 25°36′10″E
- Location: Brașov, Brașov County
- Address: Bulevardul 15 Noiembrie 29
- Country: Romania
- Denomination: Orthodox Christian

History
- Dedicated: 1934

Architecture
- Style: Neo-renaissance
- Years built: 1903

Saint George's church (Romanian: Biserica Sfântul Gheorghe, Hungarian: Szent György-templom) is a church located at 15 Noiembrie 29 Boulevard in Brașov, Romania. Originally it was as a residential building, and it was dedicated as an Orthodox church in 1934. It acquired its present look in the 1980s.

== History ==
The building was built in 1903 as a villa for a Hungarian count in the Blumăna (Bolonya) neighbourhood of the city. At that time, Brașov was part of Austria-Hungary. The count was fond of hunting, and this can be seen on the building: the sculptures, ornaments, and painted windows depict hunters, hunting dogs, deer, bears. In 1918, at the end of World War I, the count and his family left the city.

The empty villa was nationalised. At the beginning it was used as a girls' orphanage, then it became the headquarter of Gazeta de Transilvania’s editorial staff. Rooms on the upper floors were used as a chapel by Orthodox believers. As the neighbourhood of Blumăna was mostly populated by Hungarians and Transylvanian Saxons, there were no Romanian Orthodox churches up to then. The building has been declared a church in 1934 and it was dedicated for Saint George.

Orthodox people planned to build a new church in the district, but the Communists that came to power did not allow the building of new churches, so they continued to use the Saint George's church. In the years 1985–1986 they renovated the building, removed several internal walls to make an arch-vaulted nave, and built a belfry as well. The painting of the interior was finished in 1990.

After the fall of the communist regime in 1989, new Orthodox churches were built in Blumăna.

== Sources ==
- "Biserica din casă, sărbătorită de brașoveni". Digi24.
- "Biserica Sf. Gheorghe". Protopopiatul Ortodox Brașov.
- "Biserica Sfântul Gheorghe din Brașov". Creștin Ortodox.
