= Brașov =

City in Romania

Brașov Kronstadt (German)
- County seat and Municipality
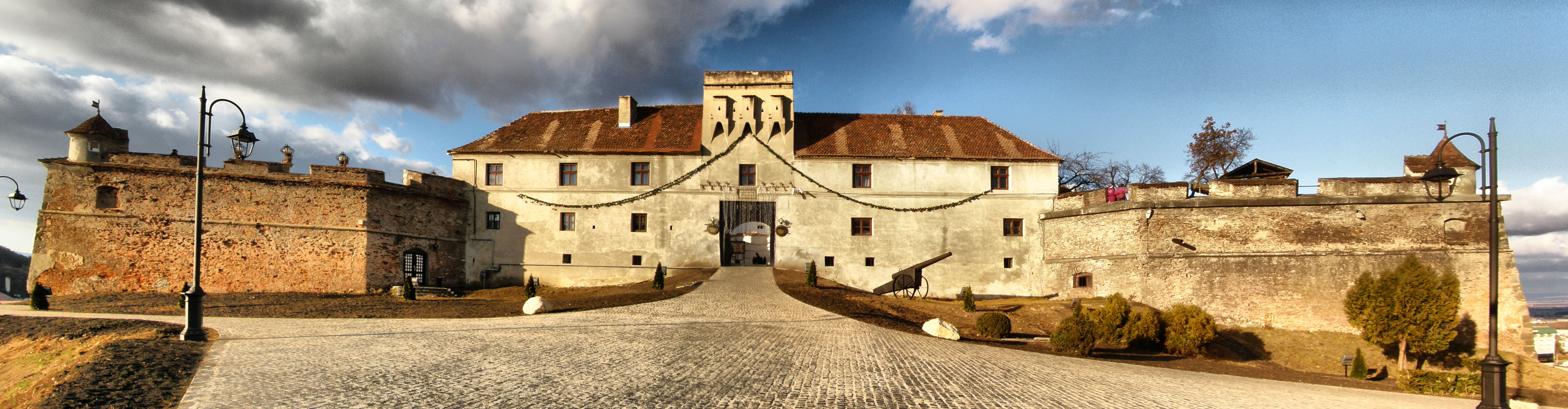
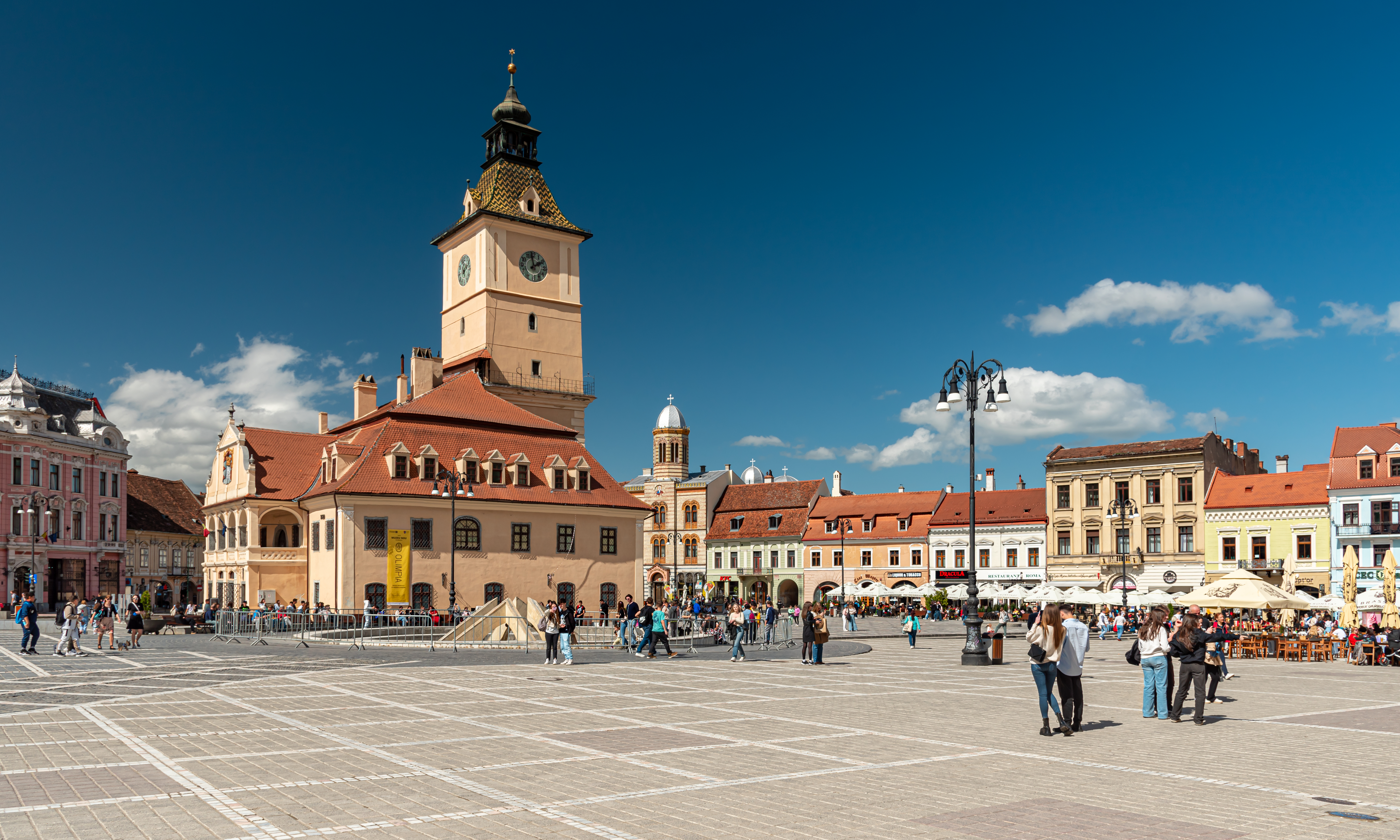
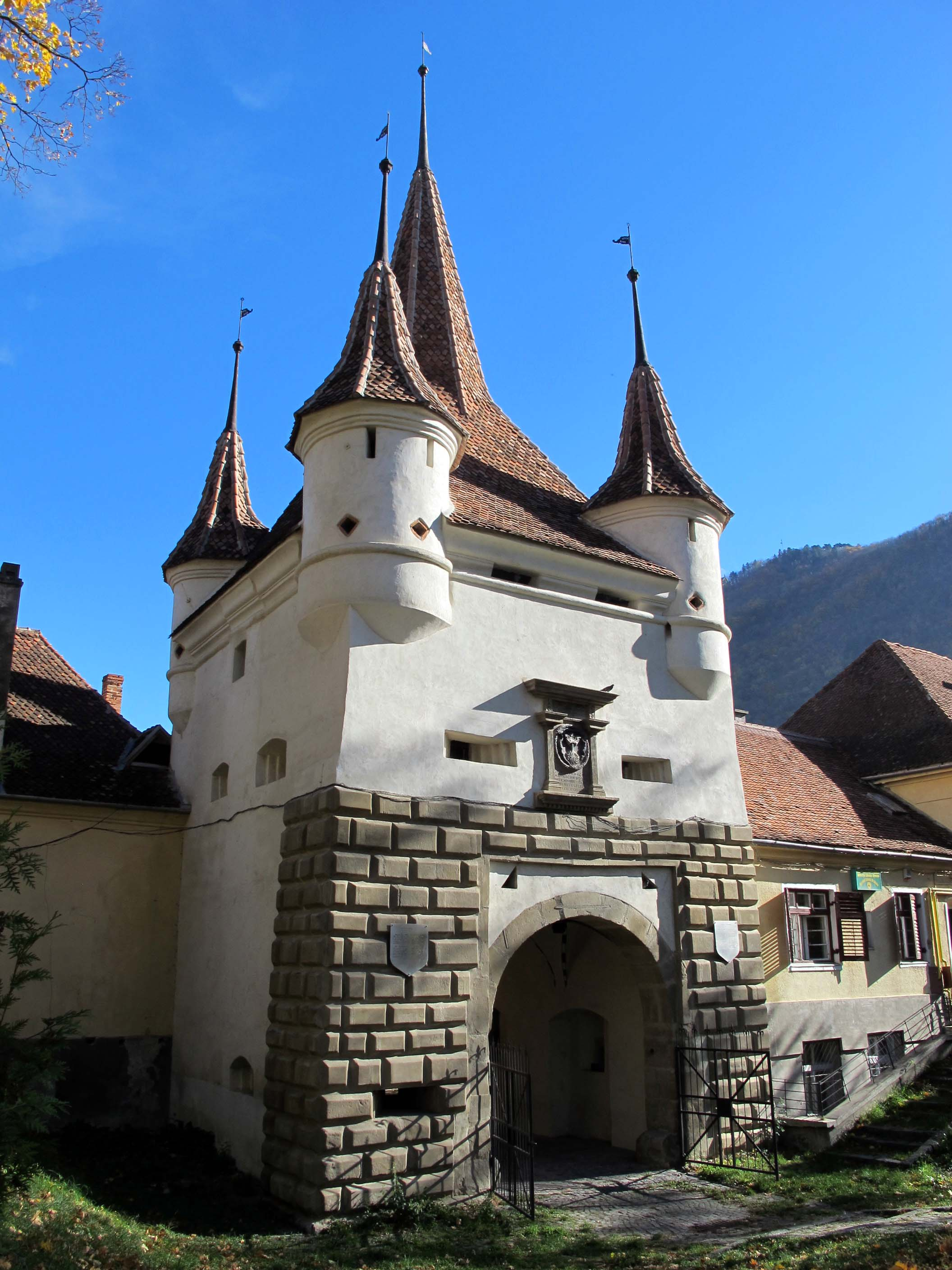
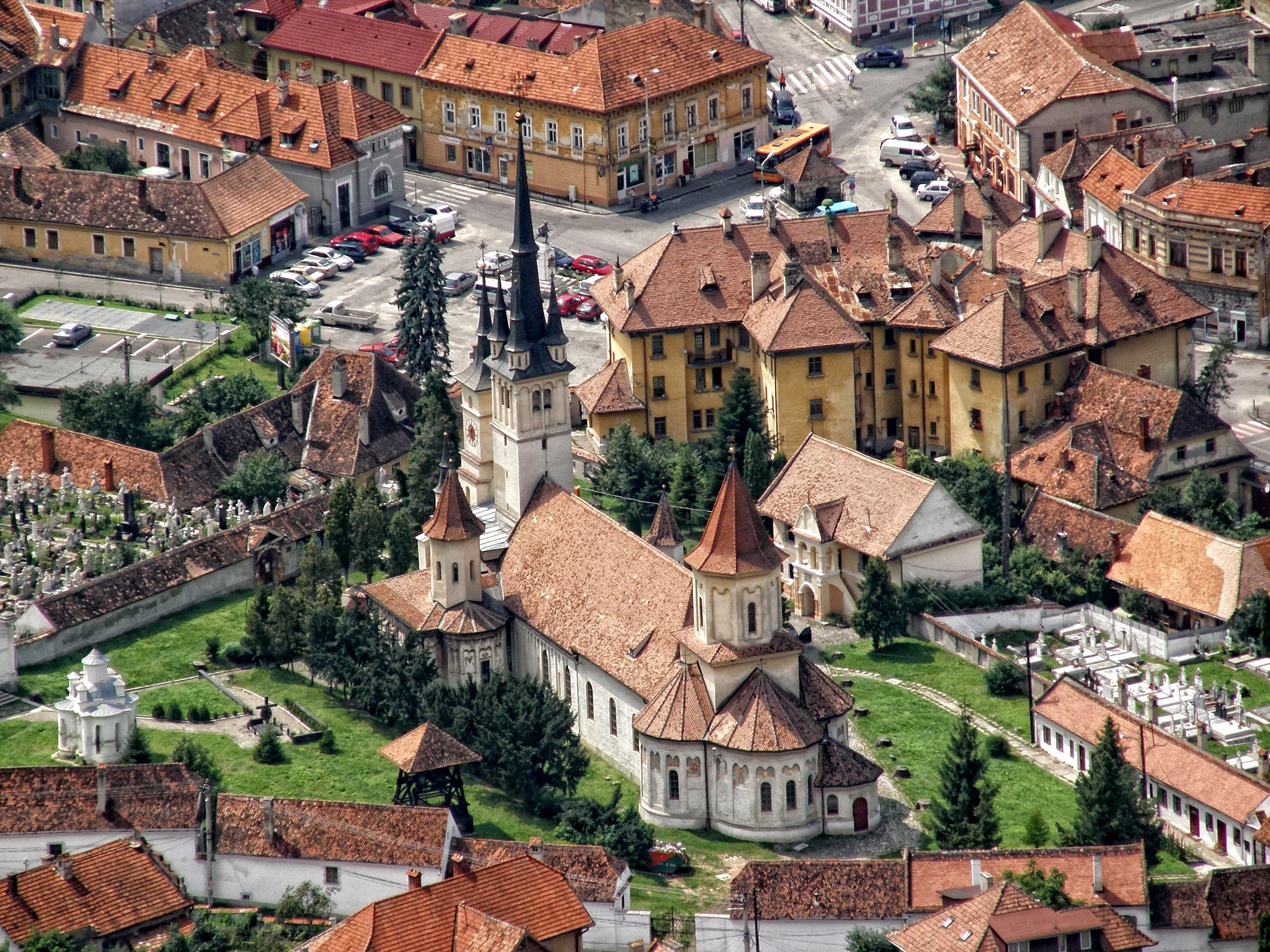
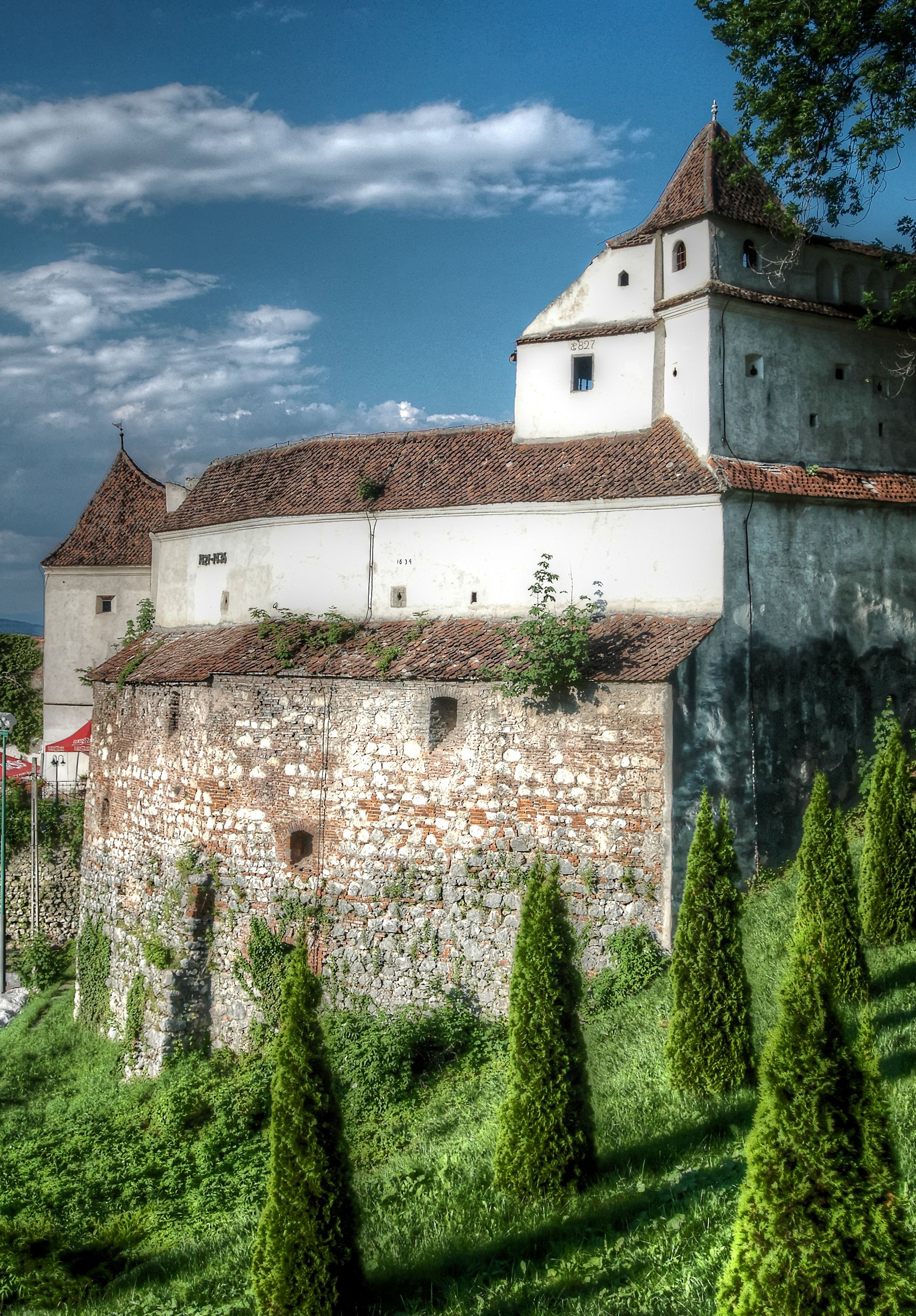
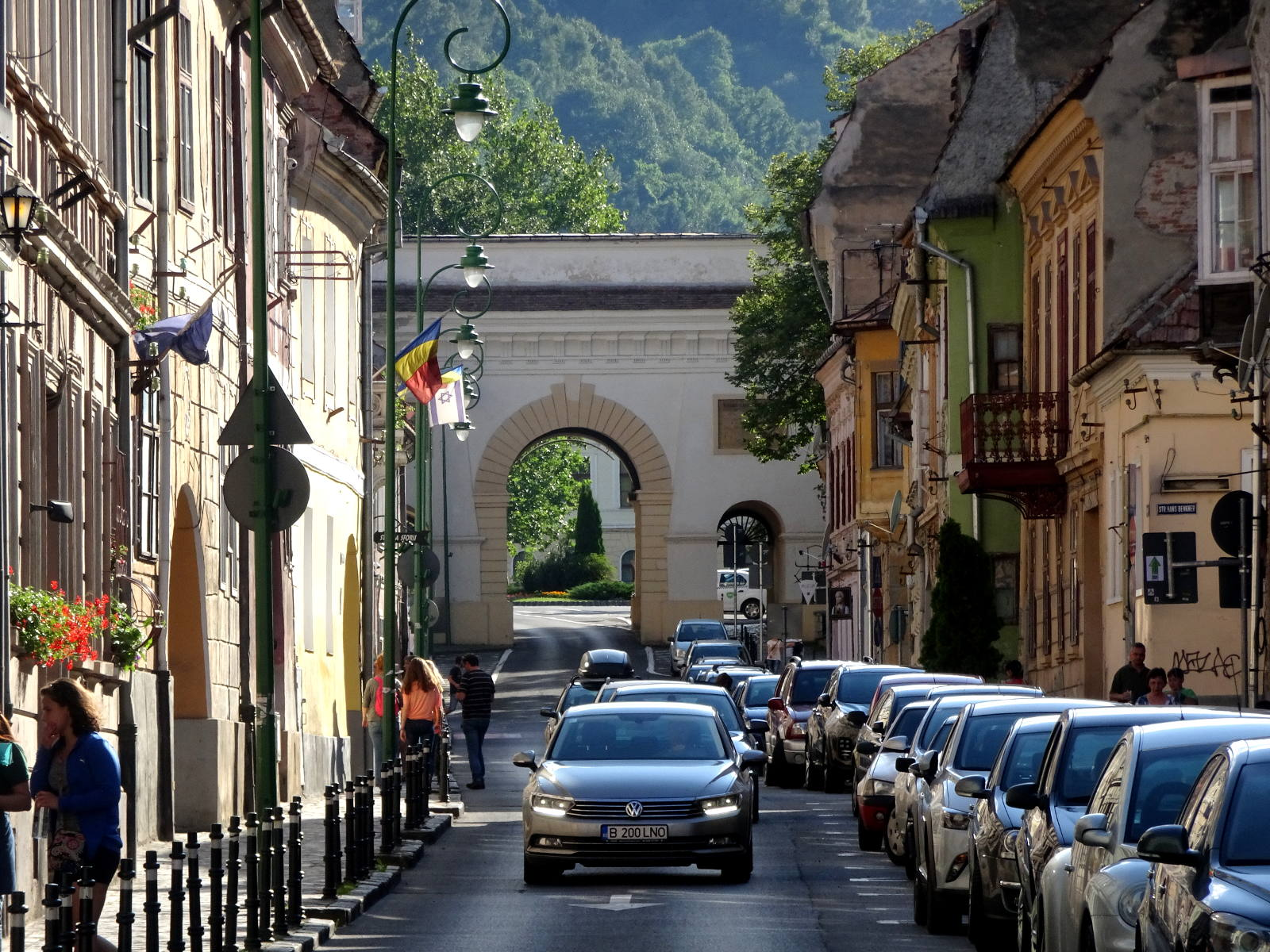
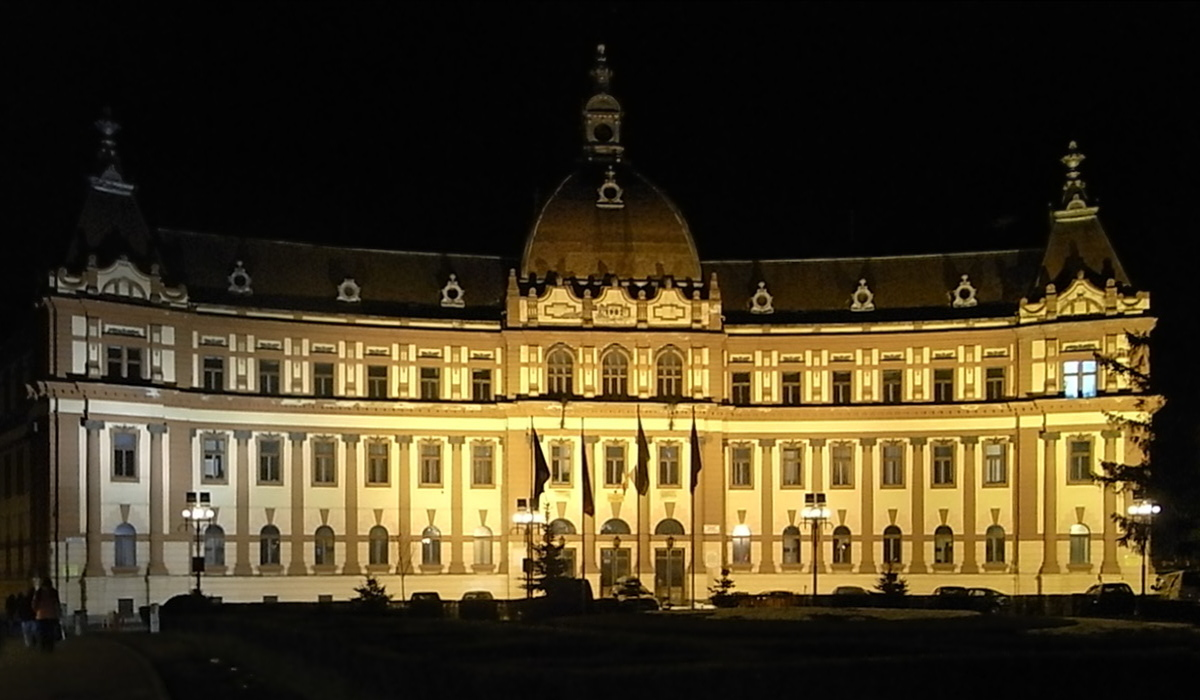
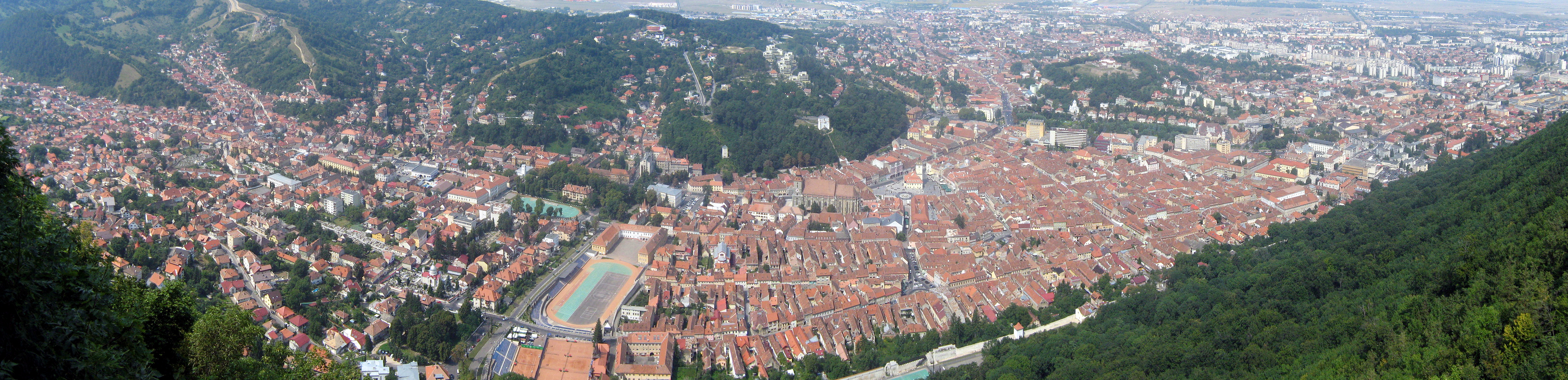
- Cetățuia de pe Strajă Black Church Council Square Catherine's Gate St. Nicholas Church Țesători Bastion Șchei Gate Prefecture Brașov seen from Tâmpa

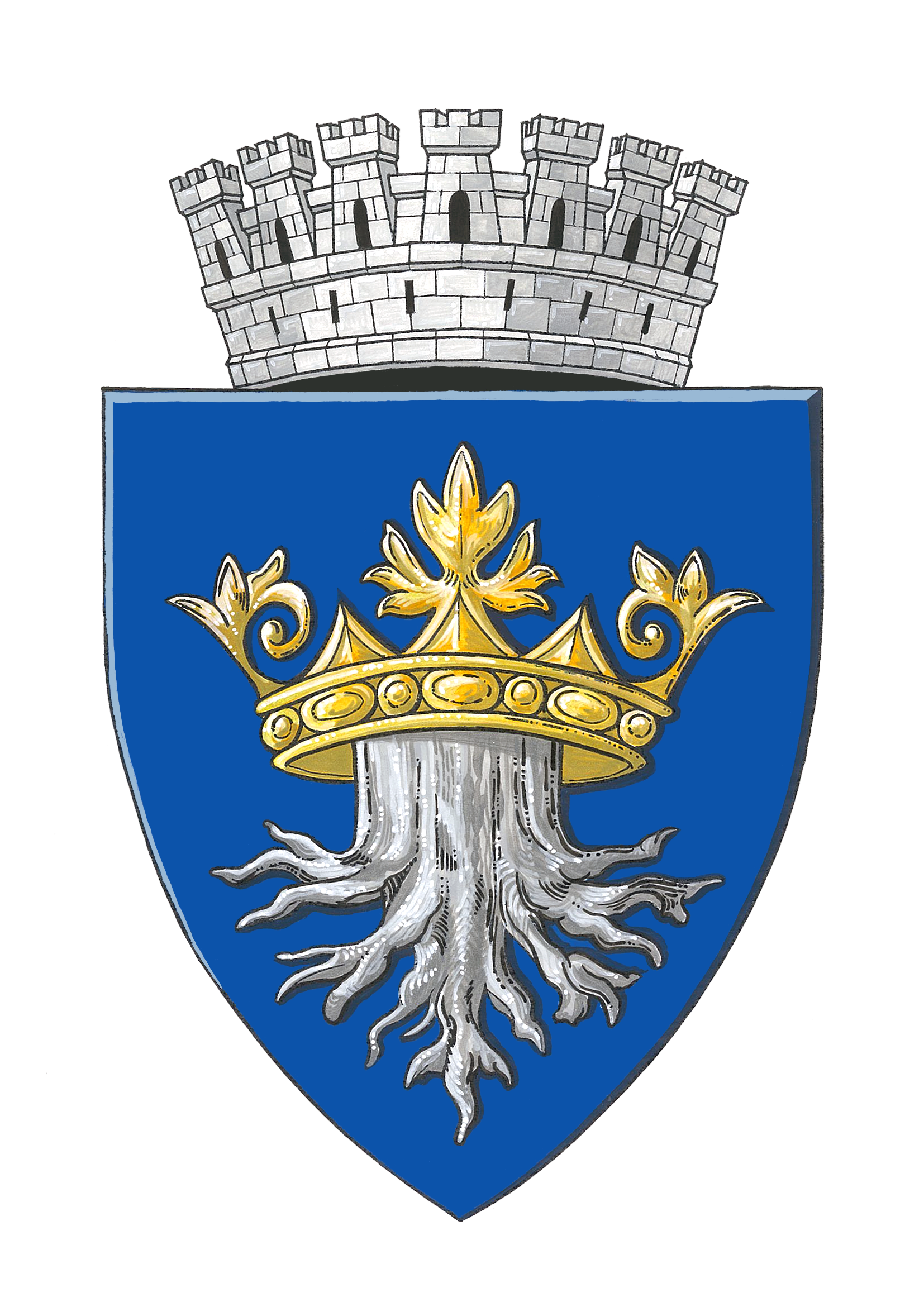
- Flag Coat of arms

- Location in Brașov County

- Location of Brașov within Romania
- Coordinates: 45°40′N 25°37′E
- Country: Romania
- County: Brașov
- Status: County capital
- First mentioned: 1235

Government
  - Mayor (2024–2028): George Scripcaru (PNL)

Area
  - County seat and Municipality: 267.32 km^{2} (103.21 sq mi)
  - Metro: 1,368.5 km^{2} (528.4 sq mi)
- Elevation: 538 m (1,765 ft)

Population (2021 census)
  - County seat and Municipality: 237,589
  - Metro: 371,802
- Demonyms: brașovean, brașoveancă

Population by ethnicity
  - Romanians: 91.2%
  - Hungarians: 7.9%
  - Germans (Transylvanian Saxons): 0.5%
  - Roma: 0.4%
- Time zone: UTC+2 (EET)
  - Summer (DST): UTC+3 (EEST)
- Postal code: RO 500xxx
- Area code: (+40) 268
- Vehicle registration: BV
- Website: www.brasovcity.ro

Brașov (UK: /bræˈʃɒv/, US: /brɑːˈʃɔːv, -ɔːf/; Romanian: [braˈʃov]; German: Kronstadt, also Brasau; Hungarian: Brassó [ˈbrɒʃːoː]; Latin: Corona; Transylvanian Saxon: Kruhnen) is a city in Transylvania, Romania and the county seat (i.e. administrative centre) of Brașov County.

According to the 2021 census, with 237,589 inhabitants, Brașov is the 6th most populous city in Romania. The metropolitan area was home to 371,802 residents.

Brașov is located in the central part of the country, about 166 km (103 mi) north of Bucharest and 380 km (236 mi) from the Black Sea. It is surrounded by the Southern Carpathians and is part of the historical region of Transylvania.

Historically, the city was the centre of the Burzenland (Romanian: Țara Bârsei), once dominated by the Transylvanian Saxons (German: Siebenbürger Sachsen), and a significant commercial hub on the trade roads between Austria (then Archduchy of Austria, within the Habsburg monarchy, and subsequently Austrian Empire) and Turkey (then Ottoman Empire). It is also where the national anthem of Romania was first sung.

== Names ==
=== Brassovia, Brassó, Brașov, etc. ===
According to Dragoș Moldovanu, the name of Brașov came from the name of local river named Bârsa (also pronounced as "Bărsa") that was adopted by Slavs and transformed to Barsa, and later to Barsov, finally to Brasov. According to Pál Binder, the current Romanian and the Hungarian name Brassó ([ˈbrɒʃʃoː]) are derived from the Turkic word barasu, meaning "white water" with a Slavic suffix -ov. Other linguists proposed various etymologies including an Old Slavic anthroponym Brasa. The first attested mention of this name is Terra Saxonum de Barasu ("Saxon Land of Baras") in a 1252 document issued by Béla IV of Hungary. According to some historians, Corona was name of the city-fortress while Brassó was referring to the county, while others consider both names may refer to the city and the county as well.

=== Corona, Kronstadt ===
According to Balázs Orbán, the name Corona – a Latin word meaning "crown" – is first mentioned in the Catalogus Ninivensis in 1235 AD, stating a monastic quarter existed in the territory of the Roman Catholic Diocese of Cumania (In Hungaria assignata est paternitas Dyocesis Cumanie: Corona). Pál Binder supposed it is a reference to the St. Catherine's Monastery. Others suggest the name derives from the old coat of arms of the city, as it is symbolized by the German name Kronstadt meaning "Crown City". The two names of the city, Kronstadt and Corona, were used simultaneously in the Middle Ages, along with the Medieval Latin Brassovia.

=== Stephanopolis, Orașul Stalin ===
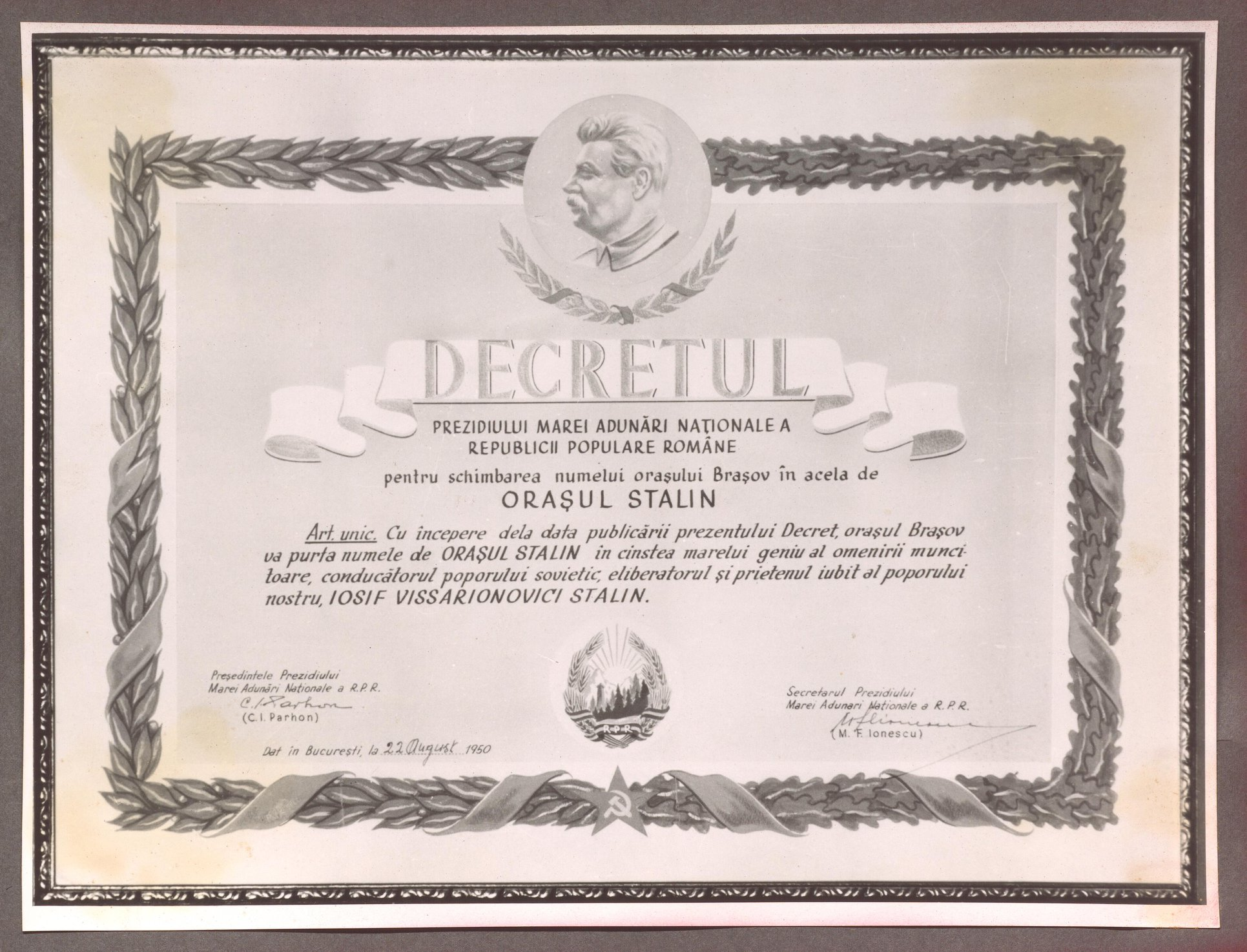
1950 decree by C. I. Parhon (co-signed by M. F. Ionescu) changing the name of Brașov to Stalin City

Another historical name used for Brașov is Stephanopolis, from "Stephanos", crown, and "polis", city.

On 22 August 1950, Brașov was renamed Orașul Stalin (lit. Stalin City) after Joseph Stalin. Constantin Ion Parhon, the nominal Head of State at the time, decreed the city be renamed "in honour of the great genius of working humanity, the leader of the Soviet people, the liberator and beloved friend of our people, Joseph Vissarionovich Stalin". The city's name reverted to Brașov in 1960.

== History ==
Historical affiliations

Kingdom of Hungary 1235–1526
Eastern Hungarian Kingdom 1526–1570
Principality of Transylvania 1570–1711
Grand Principality of Transylvania 1711–1804
Austrian Empire 1804–1867
Austria-Hungary 1867–1918 (de jure Hungary until 1920)
Kingdom of Romania 1920–1947 (de facto from 1918)
Romanian People's Republic 1947–1965
Socialist Republic of Romania 1965–1989
Romania 1989–present

The oldest traces of human activity and settlements in Brașov date back to the Neolithic age (about 9500 BCE). Archaeologists working from the last half of the 19th century discovered continuous traces of human settlements in areas situated in Brașov: Valea Cetății, Pietrele lui Solomon, Șprenghi, Tâmpa, Dealul Melcilor, and Noua. The first three locations show traces of Dacian citadels; Șprenghi Hill housed a Roman-style construction. The last two locations had their names applied to Bronze Age cultures—Schneckenberg ("Hill of the Snails"; Early Bronze Age) and Noua ("The New"; Late Bronze Age).

Transylvanian Saxons played a decisive role in Brașov's development and were invited by Hungarian kings to develop towns, build mines, and cultivate the land of Transylvania at different stages between 1141 and 1300. The settlers came primarily from the Rhineland, Flanders, and the Moselle region, with others from Thuringia, Bavaria, Wallonia, and even France.

In 1211, by order of King Andrew II of Hungary, the Teutonic Knights fortified the Burzenland to defend the border of the Kingdom of Hungary. On the site of the village of Brașov, the Teutonic Knights built Kronstadt – 'the City of the Crown'. Although the crusaders were evicted by 1225, the colonists they brought in long ago remained, along with local population in three distinct settlements they founded on the site of Brașov:

- Corona, around the Black Church (Biserica Neagră);
- Martinsberg, west of Cetățuia Hill;
- Bartholomä, on the eastern side of Sprenghi Hill.

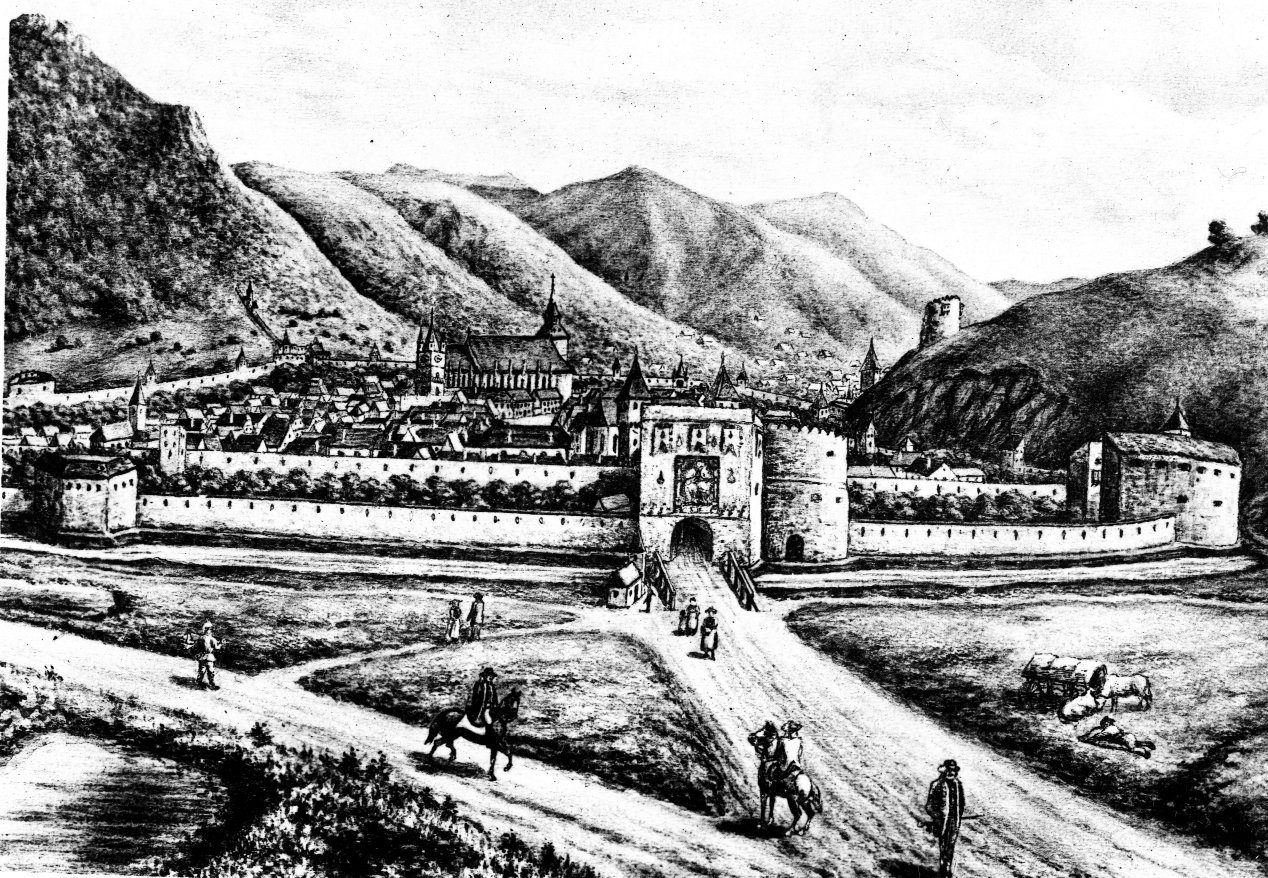
Illustration of the walled city prior to the 1689 fire

Germans living in Brașov were mainly involved in trade and crafts. The location of the city at the intersection of trade routes linking the Ottoman Empire and Western Europe, together with certain tax exemptions, allowed Saxon merchants to obtain considerable wealth and exert a strong political influence. They contributed a great deal to the architectural flavour of the city. Fortifications around the city were erected and continually expanded, with several towers maintained by different craftsmen's guilds, according to the medieval custom. Part of the fortification ensemble was recently restored using UNESCO funds, and other projects are ongoing. At least two entrances to the city, Poarta Ecaterinei (or Katharinentor) and Poarta Șchei (or Waisenhausgässertor), are still in existence. The city centre is marked by the mayor's former office building (Casa Sfatului) and the surrounding square (piața), which includes one of the oldest buildings in Brașov, the Hirscher Haus. Nearby is the "Black Church" (Biserica Neagră), which some claim to be the largest Gothic style church in Southeastern Europe.

In 1689, a great fire destroyed the walled city almost entirely, and its rebuilding lasted several decades.

Besides the German (Saxon) population living in the walled city and in the northern suburbs, Brașov had also a significant Romanian and Bulgarian population (living in the Șchei district), and also some Hungarian population (living in the Blumăna district). The cultural and religious importance of the Romanian church and school in Șchei is underlined by the generous donations received from more than thirty hospodars of Moldavia and Wallachia, as well as that from Elizabeth of Russia. In the 17th and 19th centuries, the Romanians in Șchei campaigned for national, political, and cultural rights, and were supported in their efforts by Romanians from all other provinces, as well as by the local Greek merchant community. In 1838, they established the first Romanian language newspaper Gazeta Transilvaniei and the first Romanian institutions of higher education: Școlile Centrale Greco-Ortodoxe ("The Greek-Orthodox Central Schools", today named after Andrei Șaguna). The Holy Roman Emperor and sovereign of Transylvania Joseph II awarded Romanians citizenship rights for a brief period during the latter decades of the 18th century.

In 1850, the town had 21,782 inhabitants: 8,874 (40.7%) Germans, 8,727 (40%) Romanians, 2,939 (13.4%) Hungarians. In 1910 there were 41,056 inhabitants: 17,831 (43.4%) Hungarians, 11,786 (28.7%) Romanians, 10,841 (26.4%) Germans.

On 29 August 1916, during the First World War, the Romanian Army occupied Brașov. Romanian troops entered the city at around five o'clock p.m. and paraded towards the city square. Romanian rule over the city lasted until early October, when the area was retaken by the Central Powers in the Battle of Brassó (7–9 October 1916). The Romanian mayor installed during the brief Romanian occupation was Gheorghe Baiulescu. His term lasted from 29 August, when the city was occupied by the Romanian Army, until 8 October – the height of the Battle of Brașov. On 9 October, at the end of the battle, the previous mayor Karl Ernst Schnell was reinstated.

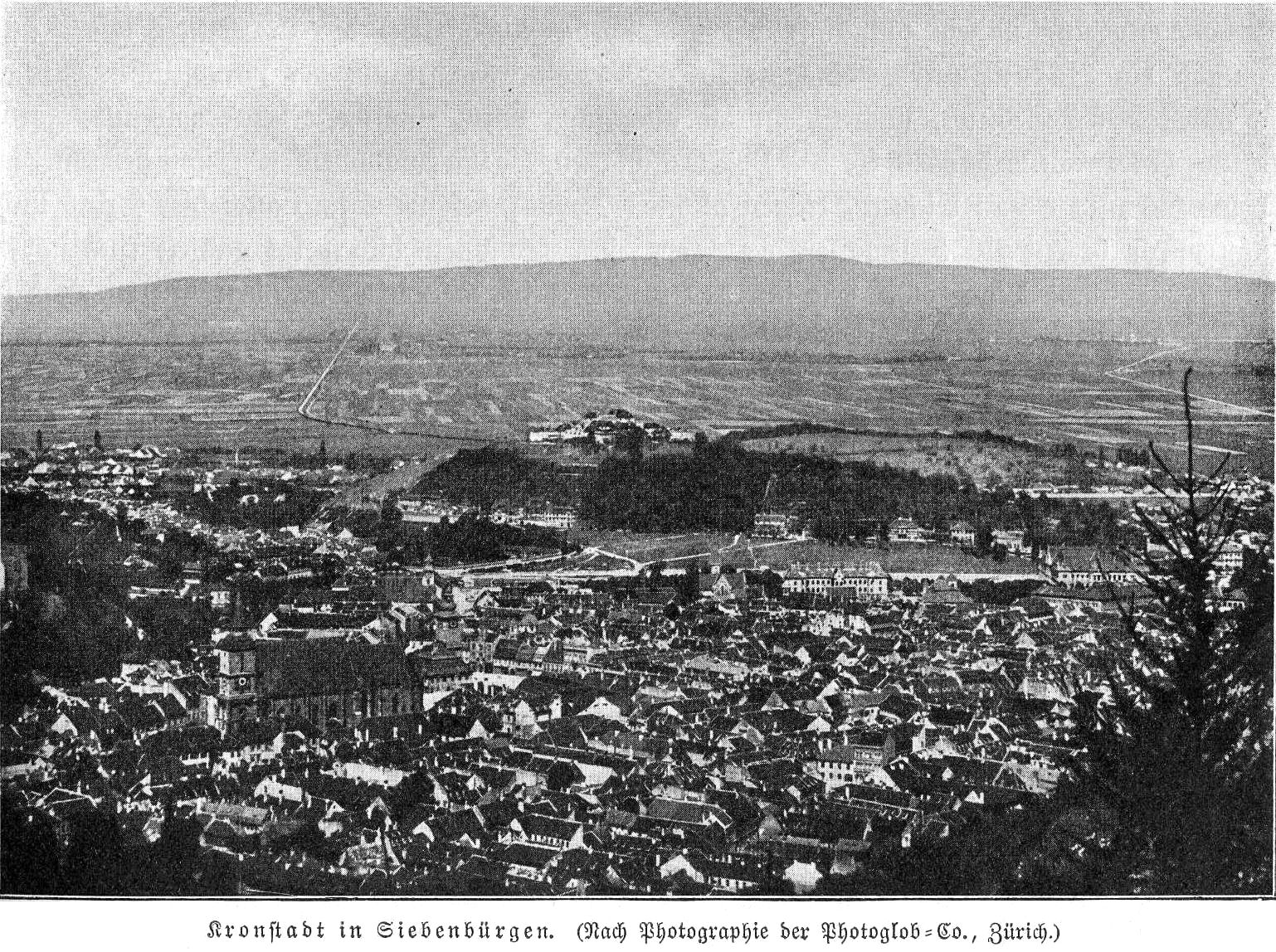
The central area, with the Black Church in the lower-left, looking north towards the fortress on Straja hill, in 1906

Following the collapse of Austria-Hungary, the 1 December 1918 Proclamation of the Union of Alba Iulia, adopted by deputies of the Romanians from Transylvania, Banat, Crișana and Maramureș during the Great National Assembly of Alba Iulia declared the union of Transylvania into the Romanian state. Brașov was permanently occupied by Romanian forces on 7 December 1918, as Hungarians gradually withdrew northwards. The King and some Transylvanians suggested that, because of Brașov's central geographical location in the new Romania, it should be considered as the new national capital. Though this did not happen, the inter-war period was a time of flourishing economy and cultural life in general, including the Saxons in Brașov. However, at the end of World War II many ethnic Germans were forcibly deported to the Soviet Union. A majority of them emigrated to West Germany after Romania had become a communist country.

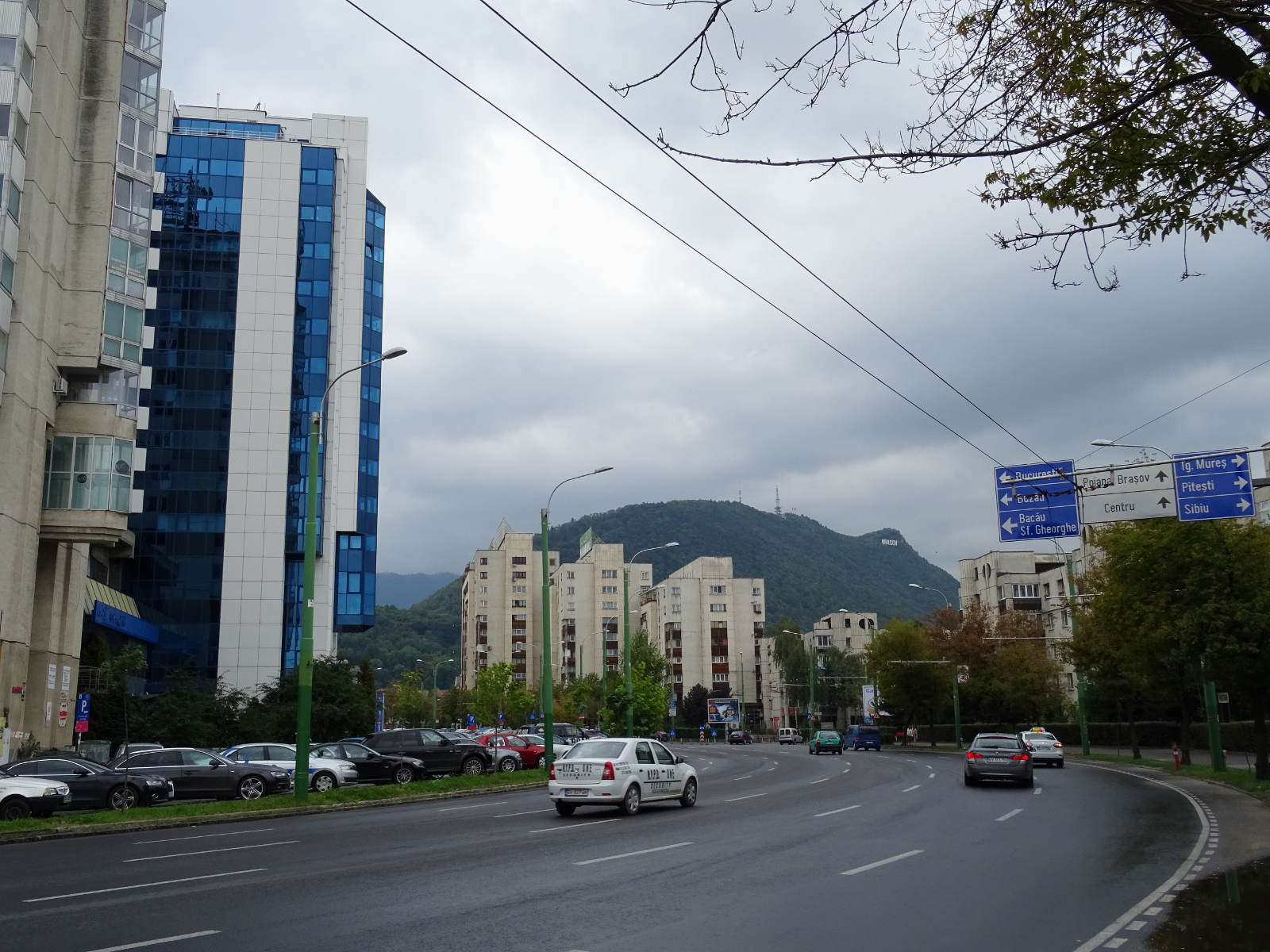
The Civic Centre (Centrul Civic), a neighbourhood built in the communist period

The first Jewish community in Brașov was established in 1828, joining the Neolog association in 1868. Orthodox Jews founded their religious organization in 1877. The Neolog synagogue, seating 800, was built between 1899 and 1905. During the interwar period, the communities had separate institutions, but opened a jointly managed school in 1940. Zionist organizations appeared already in 1920. By 1930, Jews numbered 2594 individuals, or 4% of the total population. In autumn 1940, during the National Legionary State, the antisemitic Iron Guard nationalized all Jewish institutions and seized most shops owned by Jews. In 1941, Jews were drafted for service in forced labour battalions. Those from throughout southern Transylvania were concentrated in Brașov; a further 200 refugees came from Ploiești. In August 1942, 850 Jews between the ages of 18 and 50 were drafted into labour battalions and ordered to work in Brașov, while others were sent to Predeal and Bran. In spring 1943, 250 youths were sent to Suraia camp to build fortifications. By August 1944, the labour battalions were reduced to 250–300 while most of the Jews managed to obtain their freedom. In 1945–1946, the Jewish population increased to 3500.

Like many other cities in Transylvania, Brașov is also home to a significant ethnic Hungarian minority.

During the communist period, industrial development was vastly accelerated. Under Nicolae Ceaușescu's rule, the city was the site of the 1987 Brașov strike. This was brutally repressed by the authorities and resulted in numerous workers being imprisoned.

== Economy ==
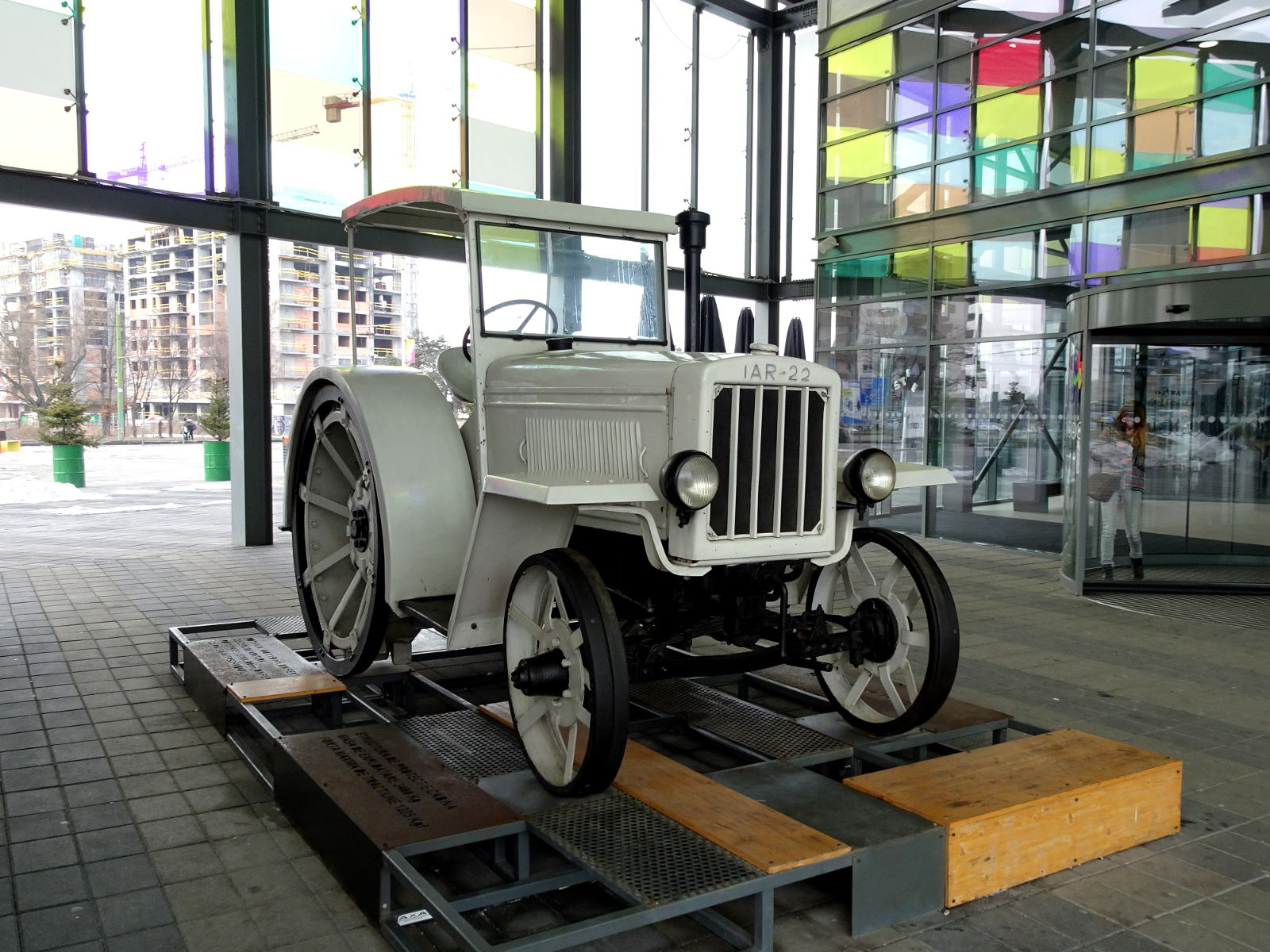
First Romanian-made tractor, the IAR 22, on display in front of the Coresi Shopping Resort

Industrial development in Brașov started in the inter-war period, with one of the largest factories being the aeroplane manufacturing plant (IAR Brașov), which produced the first Romanian fighter planes used during World War II. After signing the armistice with the USSR on September 12, 1944, the factory started repairing trucks, and in October 1945 it began manufacturing agricultural tractors. IAR 22 was the first Romanian-made wheeled tractor. In 1948 the company was renamed Uzina Tractorul Brașov known internationally as Universal Tractor Brașov. Aircraft manufacturing resumed in 1968 at first under the name ICA and then under its old name of IAR at a new location in nearby Ghimbav. A big part of the factory at Brașov was demolished during 2013 and 2014, to make way for buildings, shopping mall and recreation parks.

Industrialization was accelerated in the Communist era, with special emphasis being placed on heavy industry, attracting many workers from other parts of the country. Heavy industry is still abundant, including Roman, which manufactures MAN AG trucks as well as native-designed trucks and coaches. Although the industrial base has been in decline in recent years, Brașov is still a site for manufacturing hydraulic transmissions, auto parts, ball-bearings, construction materials, hand tools, furniture, textiles and shoe-wear. There is also a large brewery.

== Geography ==
Braşov is situated in central Romania, 85 kilometres (53 mi) northwest of Ploiești. It is at the foot of the Transylvanian Alps.

=== Climate ===
Brașov has a humid continental climate (Köppen climate classification: Dfb). The highest temperature ever recorded at the Brașov Ghimbav Meteorological Station is 37.3 °C (99.1 °F), on July 5, 2000, and the lowest is −33.3 °C (−27.9 °F), on January 8, 2015. Brașov has a temperature amplitude of 70.6 °C (127.1 °F), which is high by European standards.

Climate data for Brașov (2014–2026 normals (1981-2010 sun), extremes 1981–present)
Month	Jan	Feb	Mar	Apr	May	Jun	Jul	Aug	Sep	Oct	Nov	Dec	Year
Record high °C (°F)	17.0 (62.6)	19.3 (66.7)	26.7 (80.1)	31.5 (88.7)	32.8 (91.0)	34.2 (93.6)	37.3 (99.1)	36.9 (98.4)	34.9 (94.8)	33.0 (91.4)	26.9 (80.4)	19.1 (66.4)	37.3 (99.1)
Mean maximum °C (°F)	12.0 (53.6)	15.3 (59.5)	20.7 (69.3)	24.4 (75.9)	27.2 (81.0)	31.9 (89.4)	32.8 (91.0)	33.0 (91.4)	30.3 (86.5)	25.1 (77.2)	19.4 (66.9)	13.1 (55.6)	34.2 (93.6)
Mean daily maximum °C (°F)	2.4 (36.3)	6.3 (43.3)	10.9 (51.6)	16.1 (61.0)	20.3 (68.5)	25.4 (77.7)	27.1 (80.8)	27.6 (81.7)	22.6 (72.7)	16.4 (61.5)	9.9 (49.8)	4.4 (39.9)	15.8 (60.4)
Daily mean °C (°F)	−2.0 (28.4)	1.3 (34.3)	5.1 (41.2)	9.5 (49.1)	13.9 (57.0)	18.8 (65.8)	20.2 (68.4)	20.1 (68.2)	15.7 (60.3)	10.0 (50.0)	5.0 (41.0)	0.8 (33.4)	9.9 (49.8)
Mean daily minimum °C (°F)	−6.3 (20.7)	−3.6 (25.5)	−0.6 (30.9)	3.0 (37.4)	7.6 (45.7)	12.3 (54.1)	13.4 (56.1)	12.5 (54.5)	8.8 (47.8)	3.6 (38.5)	0.2 (32.4)	−2.7 (27.1)	4.0 (39.2)
Mean minimum °C (°F)	−20.1 (−4.2)	−14.5 (5.9)	−7.8 (18.0)	−3.8 (25.2)	1.1 (34.0)	7.0 (44.6)	8.0 (46.4)	7.4 (45.3)	0.9 (33.6)	−3.7 (25.3)	−7.0 (19.4)	−12.5 (9.5)	−21.9 (−7.4)
Record low °C (°F)	−33.3 (−27.9)	−31.6 (−24.9)	−27.3 (−17.1)	−9.6 (14.7)	−2.8 (27.0)	0.3 (32.5)	3.3 (37.9)	1.2 (34.2)	−2.7 (27.1)	−10.0 (14.0)	−22.5 (−8.5)	−28.6 (−19.5)	−33.3 (−27.9)
Average precipitation mm (inches)	25.4 (1.00)	24.5 (0.96)	43.5 (1.71)	43.9 (1.73)	75.4 (2.97)	98.7 (3.89)	82.2 (3.24)	57.1 (2.25)	48.6 (1.91)	45.0 (1.77)	33.7 (1.33)	24.2 (0.95)	602.2 (23.71)
Average precipitation days	6.1	5.3	7.3	7.5	10.5	10.5	9.2	5.9	6.4	7.2	6.9	6.2	89
Average snowy days	9.2	6.0	3.7	1.8	0	0	0	0	0	0	2.4	7.1	30.2
Mean monthly sunshine hours	73.7	100.8	150.1	167.4	223.9	231.9	249.3	244.0	182.2	156.5	93.9	64.5	1,938.2
Source: Meteomanz.com; Adaptări la schimbările climatice în regiunea 07 Centru

== Demographics ==
Historical population
Year	Pop.	±%
1890	30,781	—
1900	34,511	+12.1%
1910	41,056	+19.0%
1930	59,232	+44.3%
1941	84,557	+42.8%
1948	82,984	−1.9%
1956	123,834	+49.2%
1966	163,345	+31.9%
1975 (est.)	206,156	+26.2%
1983 (est.)	331,240	+60.7%
1992	323,736	−2.3%
2002	284,596	−12.1%
2011	253,200	−11.0%
2021	237,589	−6.2%
Sources: 1930-1948 censuses, 1956 census, 1966 census, 2011 census. 1975 and 1983 data are estimates.

Brașov has a total population of 237,589 (2021 census). Its ethnic composition includes (as of 2011):

- Romanians: 208,019 (91.3%)
- Hungarians: 16,172 (7.1%)
- Germans (Transylvanian Saxons): 1,079 (0.5%)
- Romani people: 916 (0.4%)
- Other ethnicities: 1,037 (0.7%)

In 2005, the Brașov metropolitan area was created. With its surrounding localities, Brașov had 371,802 inhabitants as of 2021.

== Administration ==
Brașov is administered by a mayor and a local council. The current mayor of Brașov (starting October 21, 2024) is George Scripcaru from the National Liberal Party (PNL).

The Brașov Local Council, elected at the 2024 Romanian local elections, is made up of 27 counselors, with the following party composition:

Party	Seats	Current Local Council
National Coalition for Romania (PSD-PNL)	13	
United for Brașov Alliance (USR-PMP-FD-FDGR)	11	
Alliance for the Union of Romanians (AUR)	2	
Independent (Ind.)	1	

== Education ==
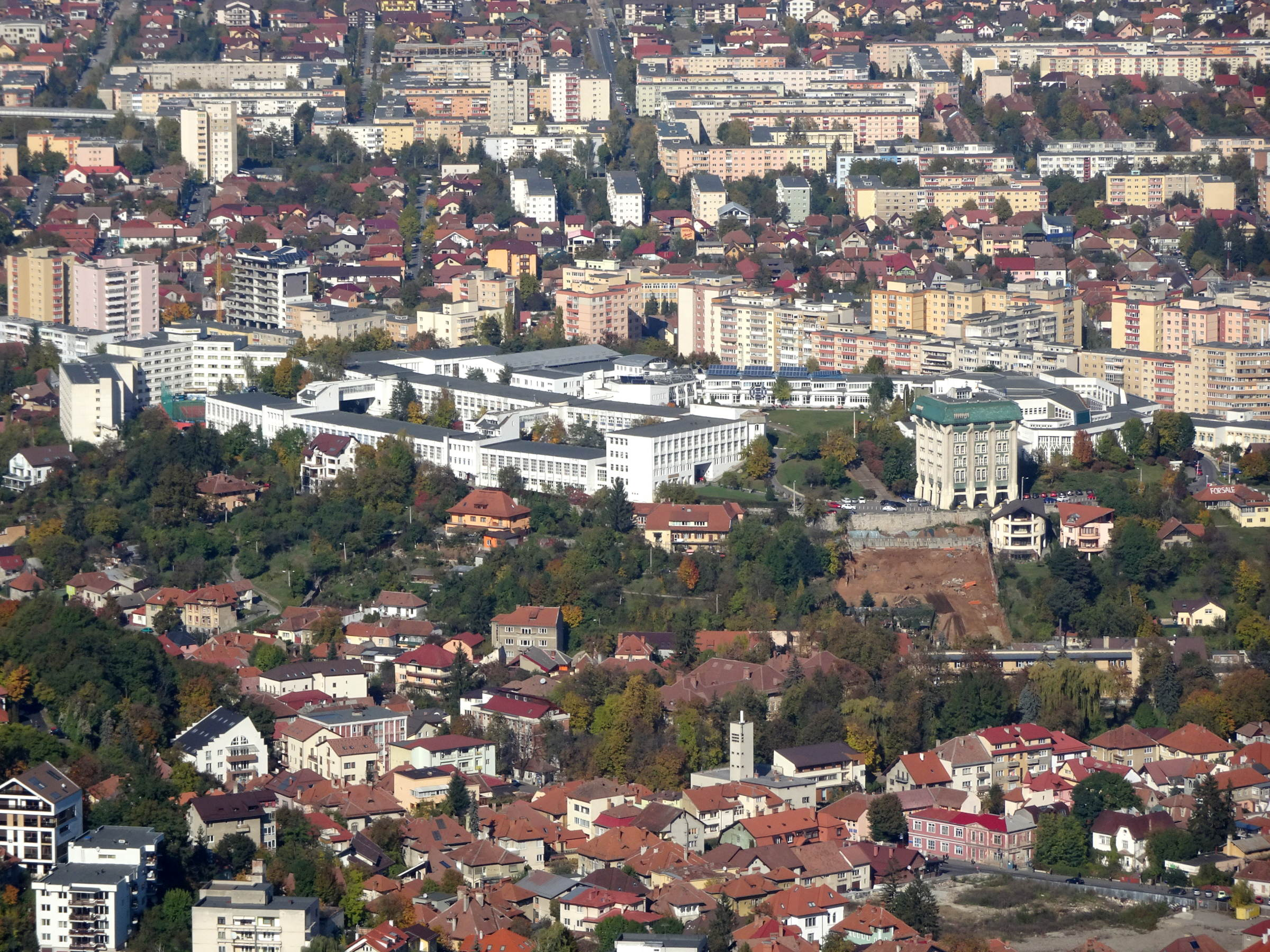
Transilvania University of Brașov

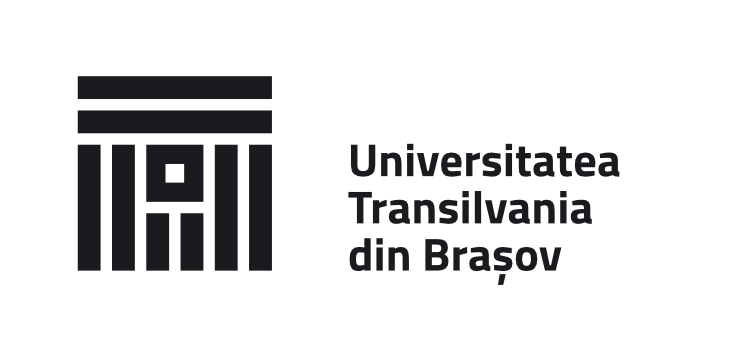
Transilvania University logo

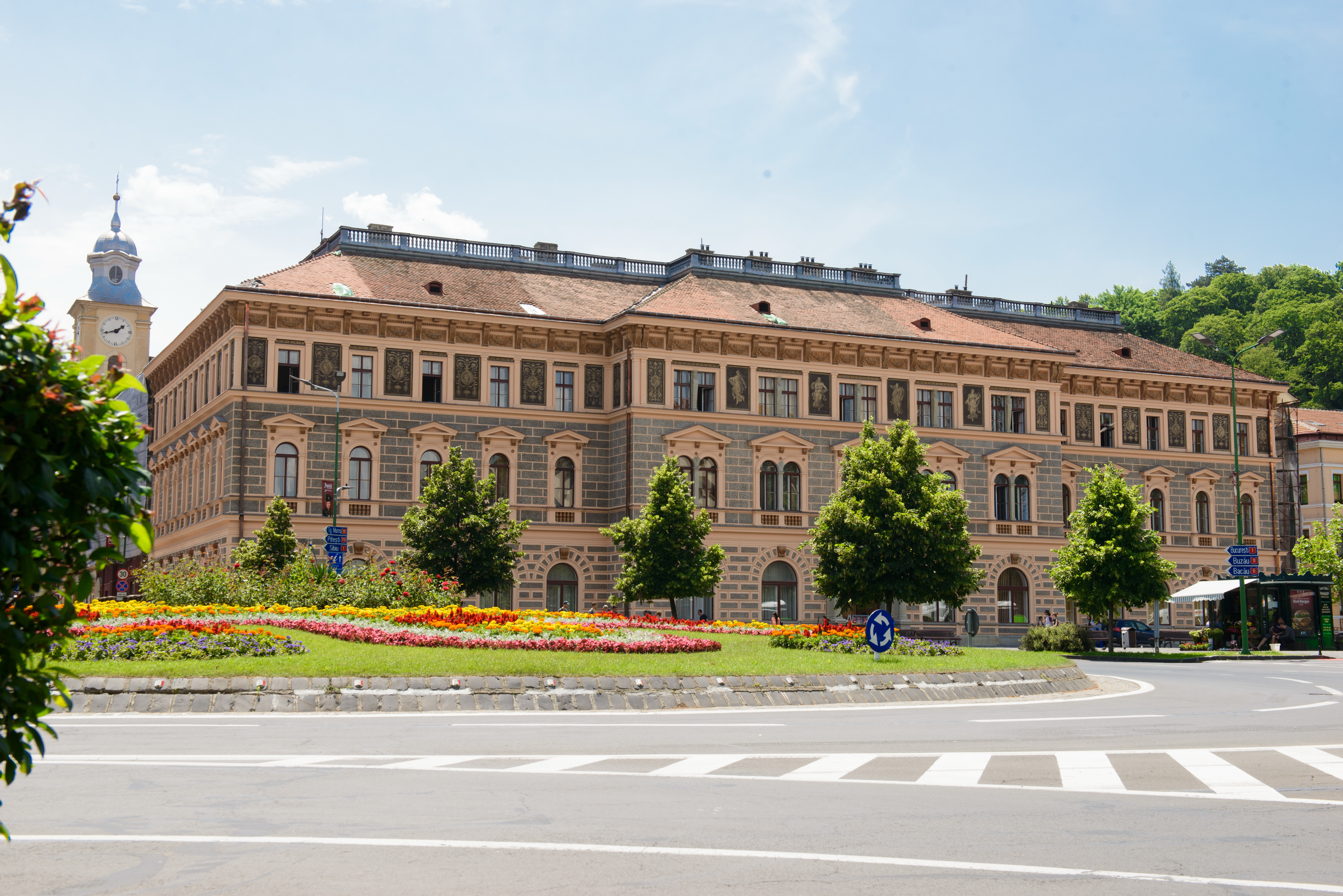
The Rectorate of Transilvania University of Brașov

=== Primary schools ===
- 30 Primary Schools

=== High schools ===
- Colegiul Național "Andrei Șaguna"
- Colegiul Național "Dr. Ioan Meșotă"
- Colegiul Național de Informatică "Grigore Moisil"
- Colegiul Național "Unirea"
- Colegiul Național Johannes Honterus
- Colegiul Național "Áprily Lajos"
- Liceul "Andrei Mureșanu"
- Colegiul de Științe ale Naturii "Emil Racoviță"
- Liceul "Nicolae Titulescu"
- Liceul Vocațional de Muzica "Tuodr Ciortea"
- Liceul Vocațional de Arte Plastice "Hans Mattis-Teutsch"
- Liceul cu Program Sportiv
- Colegiul de Științe "Grigore Antipa"
- Liceul Teoretic "Constantin Brâncoveanu"
- Seminarul Teologic Liceal Ortodox "Dumitru Stăniloaie"
- Colegiul Tehnic "Transilvania"
- Colegiul Tehnic "Mircea Cristea"
- Colegiul Tehnic "Iosif Silimon"
- Colegiul Tehnic "Sfinții Voievozi"
- Grupul Școlar de Arte și Meserii
- Colegiul Tehnic "Remus Răduleț"
- Colegiul Tehnic Feroviar
- Grupul Școlar Industrial Auto
- Colegiul Tehnic "Maria Baiulescu"
- Grupul Școlar Industrial de Construcții Montaj
- Colegiul National Economic "Andrei Bârseanu"
- Grupul Școlar Silvic "Dr. Nicolae Rucăreanu"
- Grupul Școlar de Turism și Alimentație Public
- Liceul "FEG"
- Liceul "Europa Unită"

=== Universities ===
- Transilvania University of Brașov
- George Barițiu University
- Spiru Haret University
- Christian University Dimitrie Cantemir
- Academia Forțelor Aeriene Henri Coandă
- Fundația Universitară Sfinții Apostoli Petru și Pavel
- Sextil Pușcariu University
- Universitatea Româno-Canadiană
- American Hotel Academy

== Transportation ==
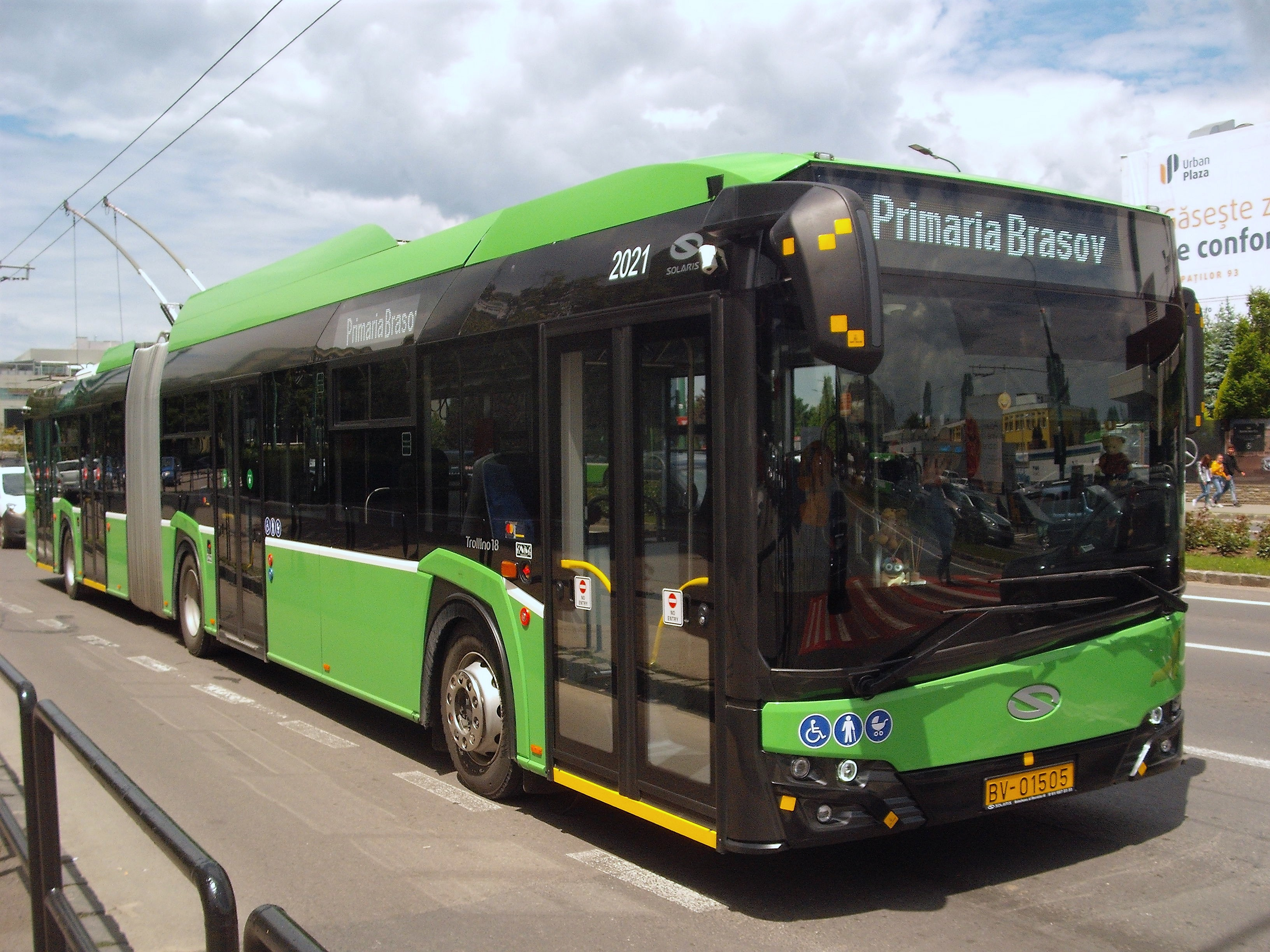
Solaris Trollino 18 trolleybus on the streets of Brașov

The Brașov local transport network has 44 urban bus and trolleybus lines and 19 metropolitan bus lines. There are also regular bus lines serving Poiana Brașov, a nearby winter resort and part of the city of Brașov. All are operated by RAT Brașov.

In the past, a tramway system served Brașov from 1892 to 1960. A new tram system opened in August 1987, serving a single route with a fleet of 20 Romanian-built articulated cars in its first years, later replaced by used trams from Leipzig and Frankfurt. However the city's second tram system lasted less than 20 years, closing in November 2006.

Because of its central location, the Brașov railway station is one of the busiest stations in Romania with trains to/from most destinations in the country served by rail. CFR announced a feasibility study for the construction of a rail line (8 km) which would connect the airport to the Brașov railway station.

The Brașov-Ghimbav International Airport is an international airport located in nearby Ghimbav, right by the future A3 motorway. It is the first airport to be developed in post-communist Romania, and the 17th commercial airport in the country. The contract for the construction of the main terminal building, with a total area of 11,780 m^{2} (126,799 sq ft), was awarded to the Romanian contractor Bog'Art Bucharest and was signed on 21 August 2019. Construction works for the passenger terminal started on 17 March 2020 and the first commercial flight took place on June 15, 2023.

== Tourism ==
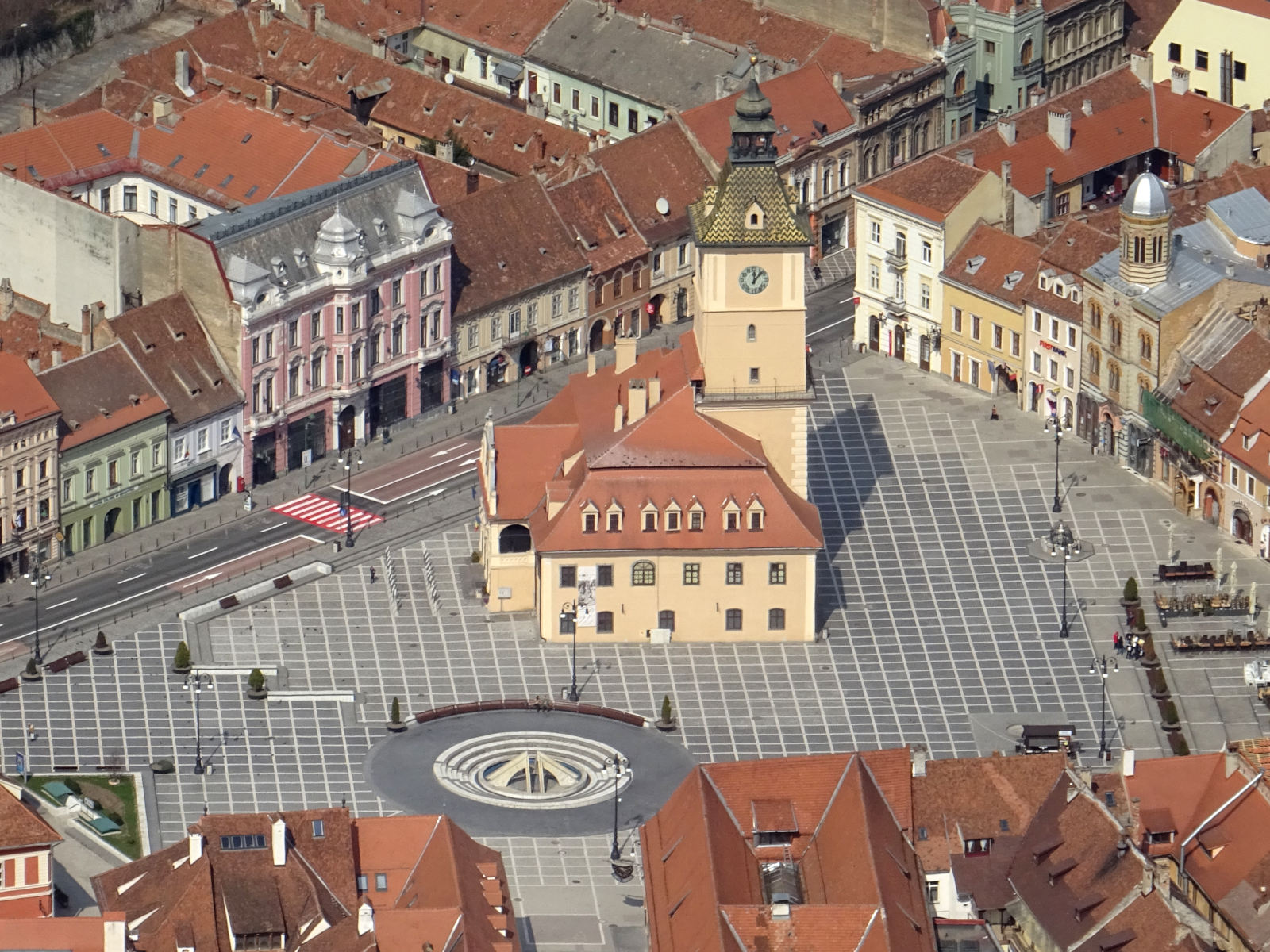
The city center (Piața Sfatului)

With its central location, Brașov is a suitable location from which to explore Romania, and the distances to several tourist destinations (including the Black Sea resorts, the monasteries in northern Moldavia, and the wooden churches of Maramureș) are similar. It is also the largest city in a mountain resorts area. The old city is very well preserved and is best seen by taking the cable-car to the top of Tâmpa Mountain.

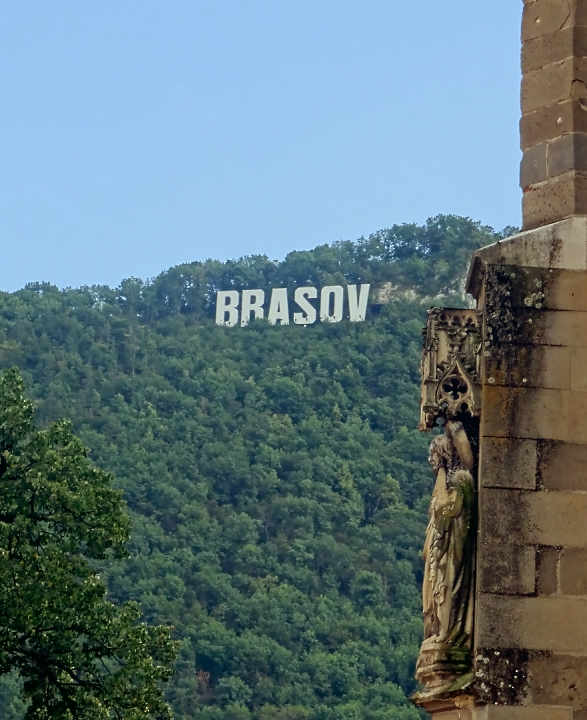
One of the statues of Biserica Neagră and the BRAȘOV sign on the Tâmpa Mountain

Temperatures from May to September fluctuate around 23 °C (73 °F). Brașov benefits from a winter tourism season centred on winter sports and other activities. Poiana Brașov is the most popular Romanian ski resort and an important tourist centre preferred by many tourists from other European states.

The city ranks on the second place in terms of tourism arrivals countrywide, after the capital Bucharest.

=== Sights ===
- Biserica Neagră ("The Black Church"; German: Die Schwarze Kirche), a celebrated Gothic site – the building dates from 1477, when it replaced an older church (demolished around 1385). It acquired the name after being blackened by smoke from the 1689 Great Fire.
- Franciscan Church, Brașov
- Casa Sfatului ("The mayor's former office building"). The administration for Brașov was here for more than 500 years.
- Biserica Sf. Nicolae (St. Nicholas Church), dating back to the 14th century.
- The First Romanian School, a museum with the first Romanian printing press among many other firsts.
- The Rope Street, the narrowest street in Romania.
- Turnul Negru, Old City Watch Tower.
- Turnul Alb, Old City Watch Tower.
- Șchei, the historically Bulgarian but then Romanian neighbourhood outside of the old walled city.
- Catherine's Gate (German: Katherines Tor), the only original city gate to have survived from medieval times.
- Șchei Gate, next to Catherine's Gate, built in 1827.
- Tâmpa, a small mountain in the middle of the city (900m above sea level), a sightseeing spot near the old city centre.
- The "Brașov Citadel Fortress" – Cetățuia Brașovului
- The nearby Bran Castle, attracting many fans of Dracula and often (but incorrectly) said to have been the home of Vlad the Impaler.
- Poiana Brașov, mainly a ski resort but also a sightseeing spot.
- Râșnov Fortress, above the nearby town of Râșnov, is a restored peasant fortress
- Prejmer Fortress (German: Tartlau Festung), in the nearby commune of Prejmer (German: Tartlau)
- Saint George's Church, Brașov
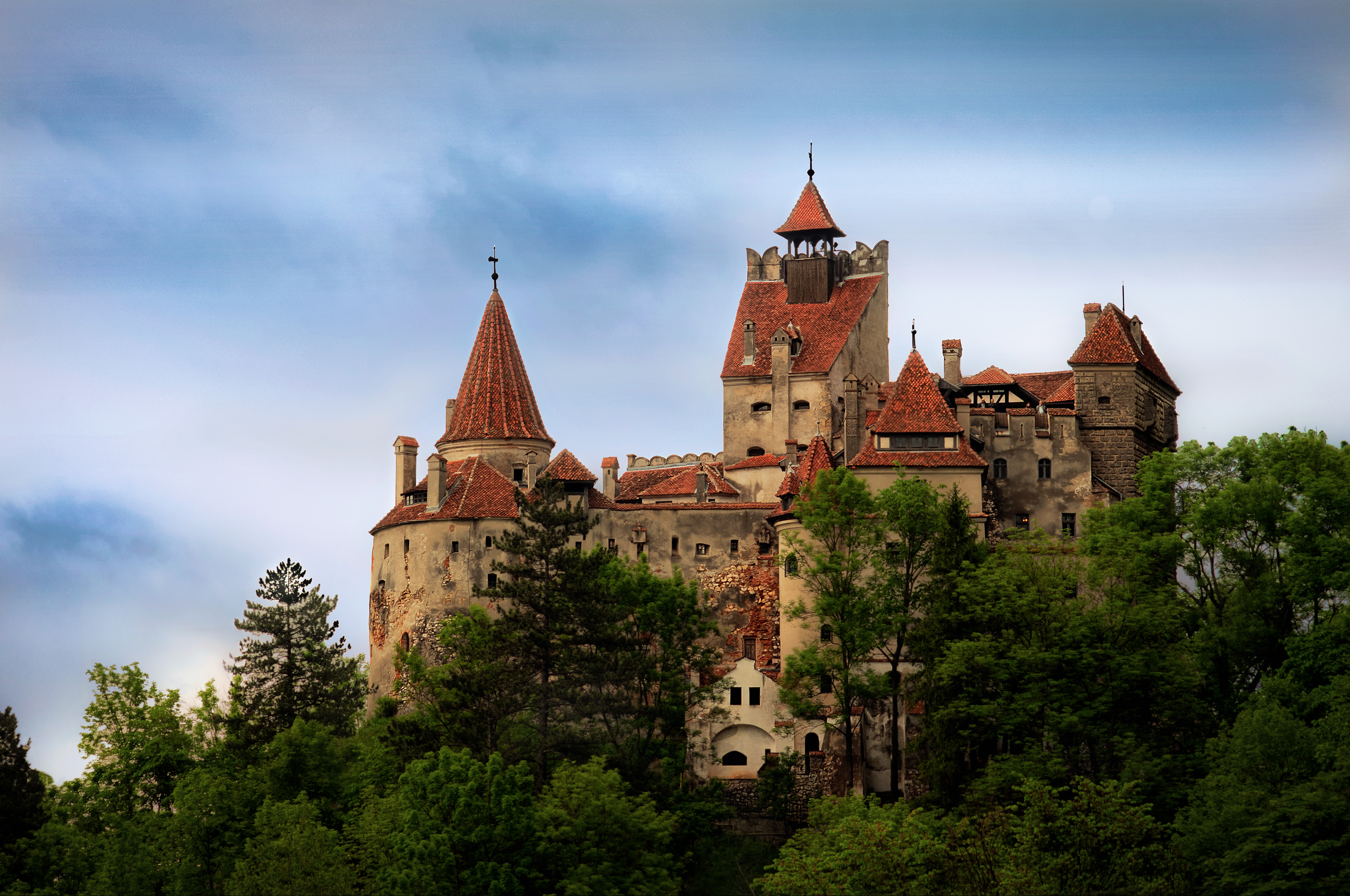
Bran Castle (German: Die Törzburg), situated in the immediate vicinity of Brașov

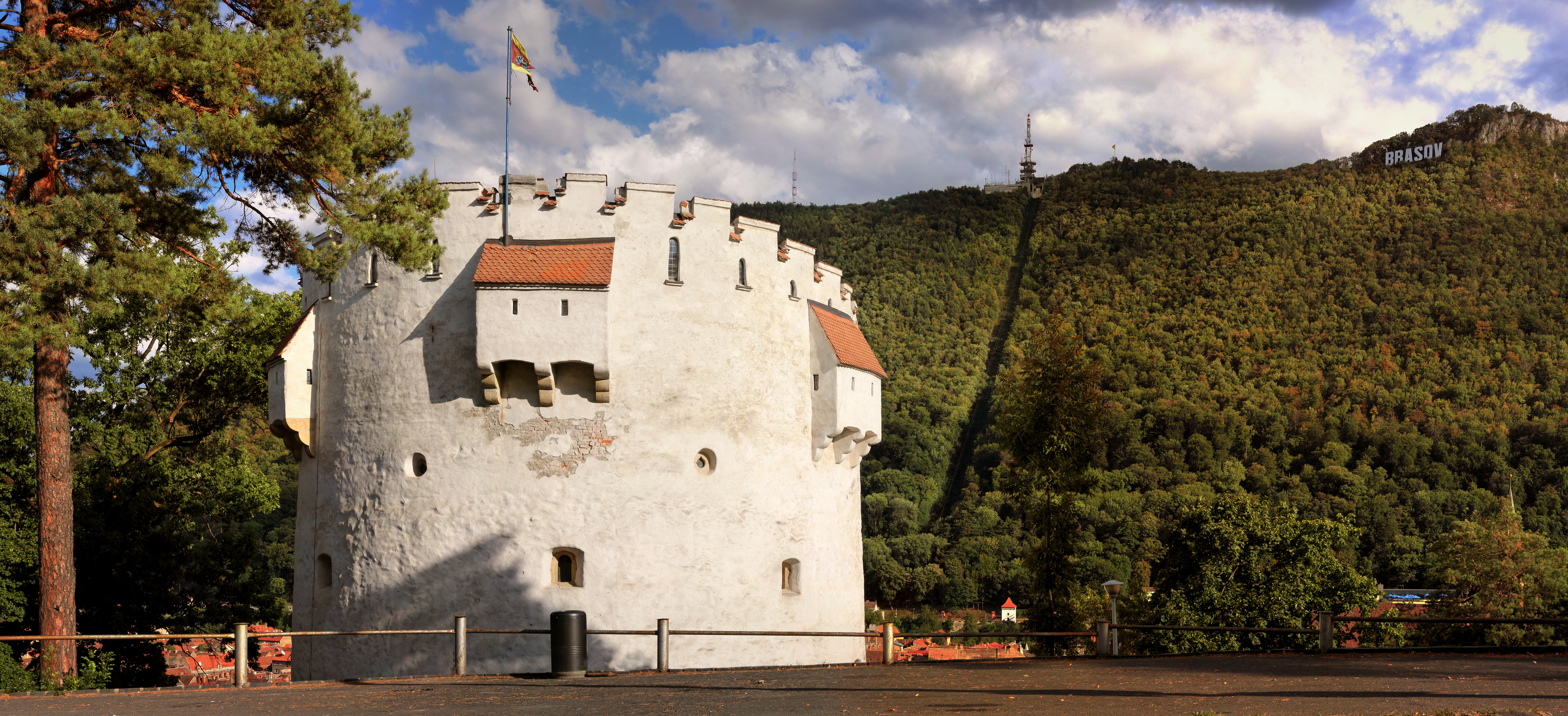
White Tower with Mount Tâmpa in the background

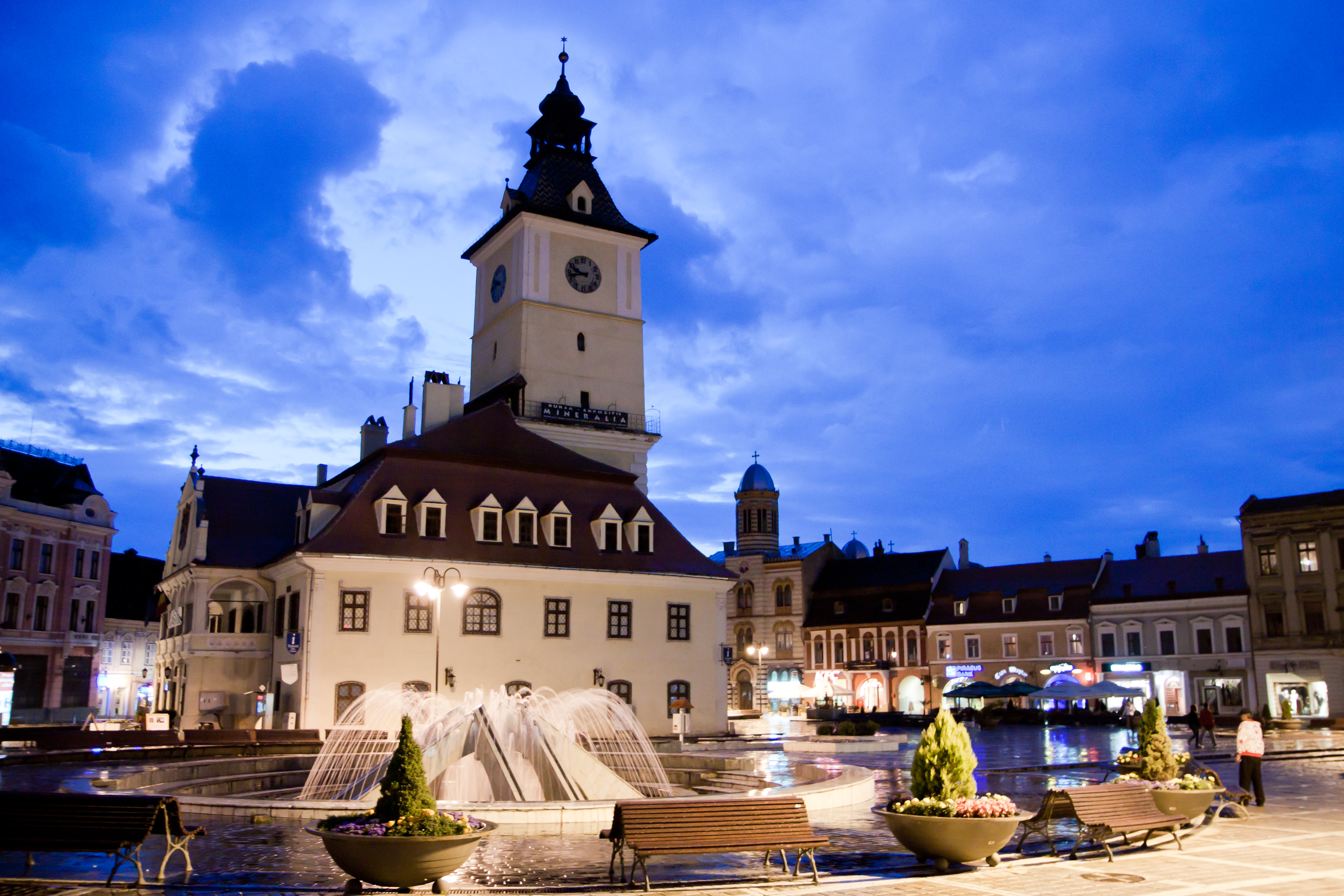
Council Square

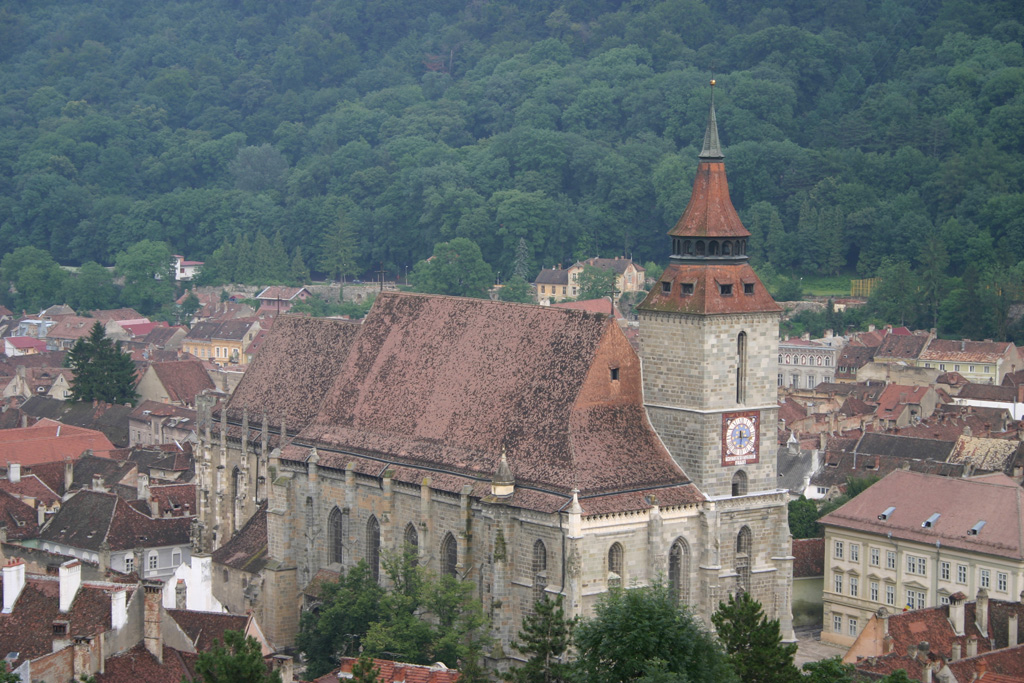
Black Church (German: Die Schwarze Kirche)

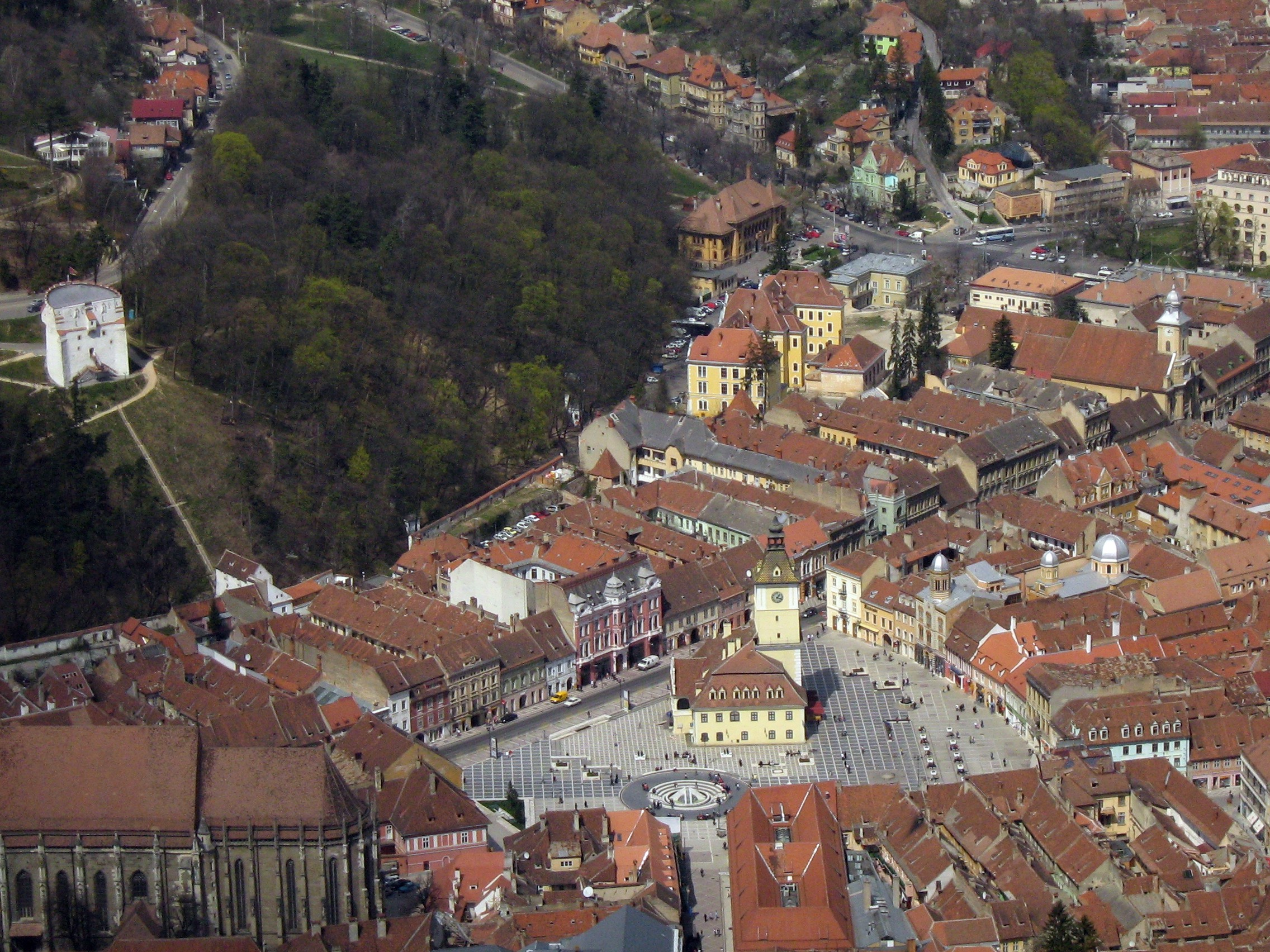
City center seen from Mount Tâmpa

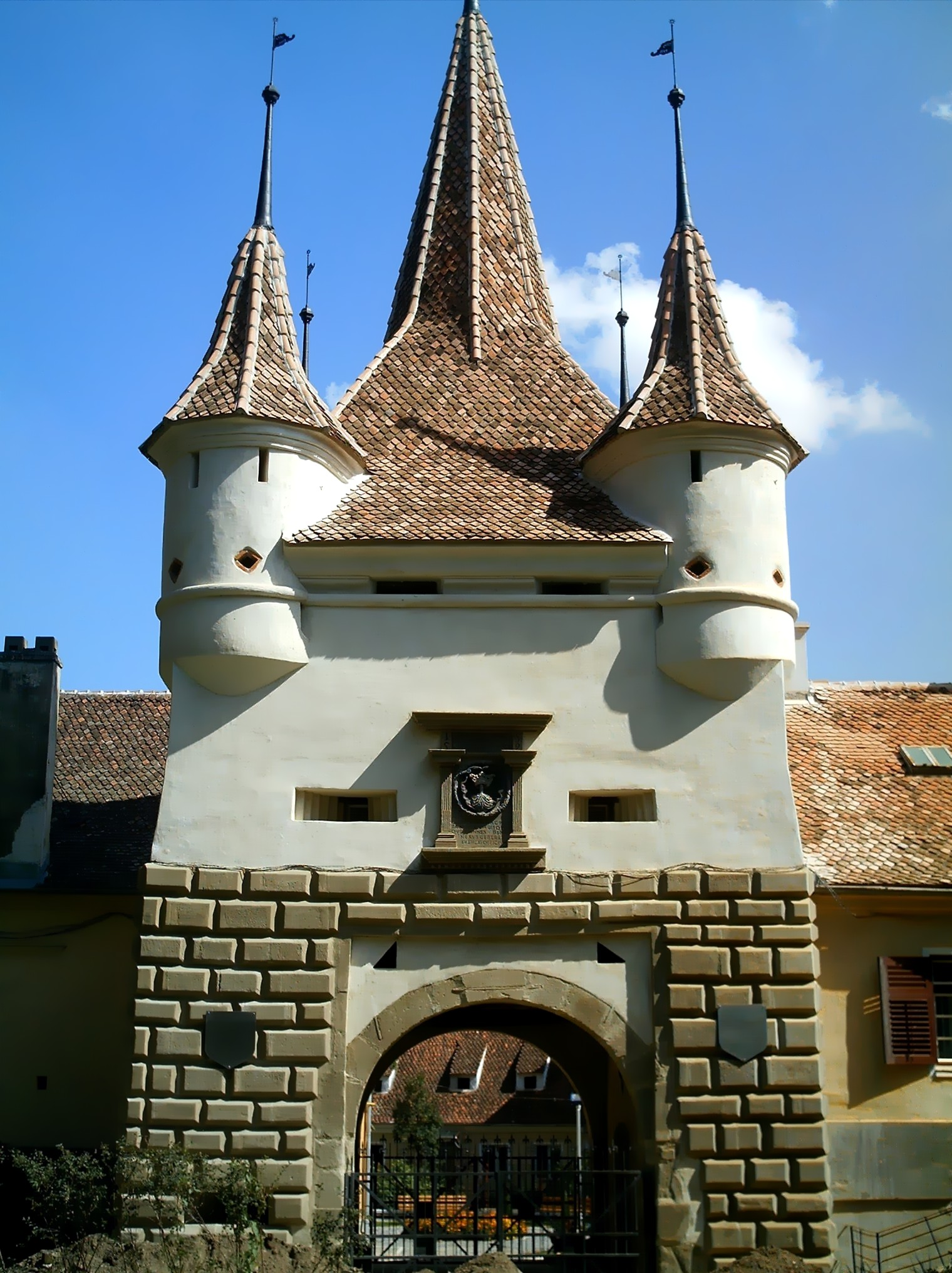
Catherine's Gate (German: Katherines Tor)

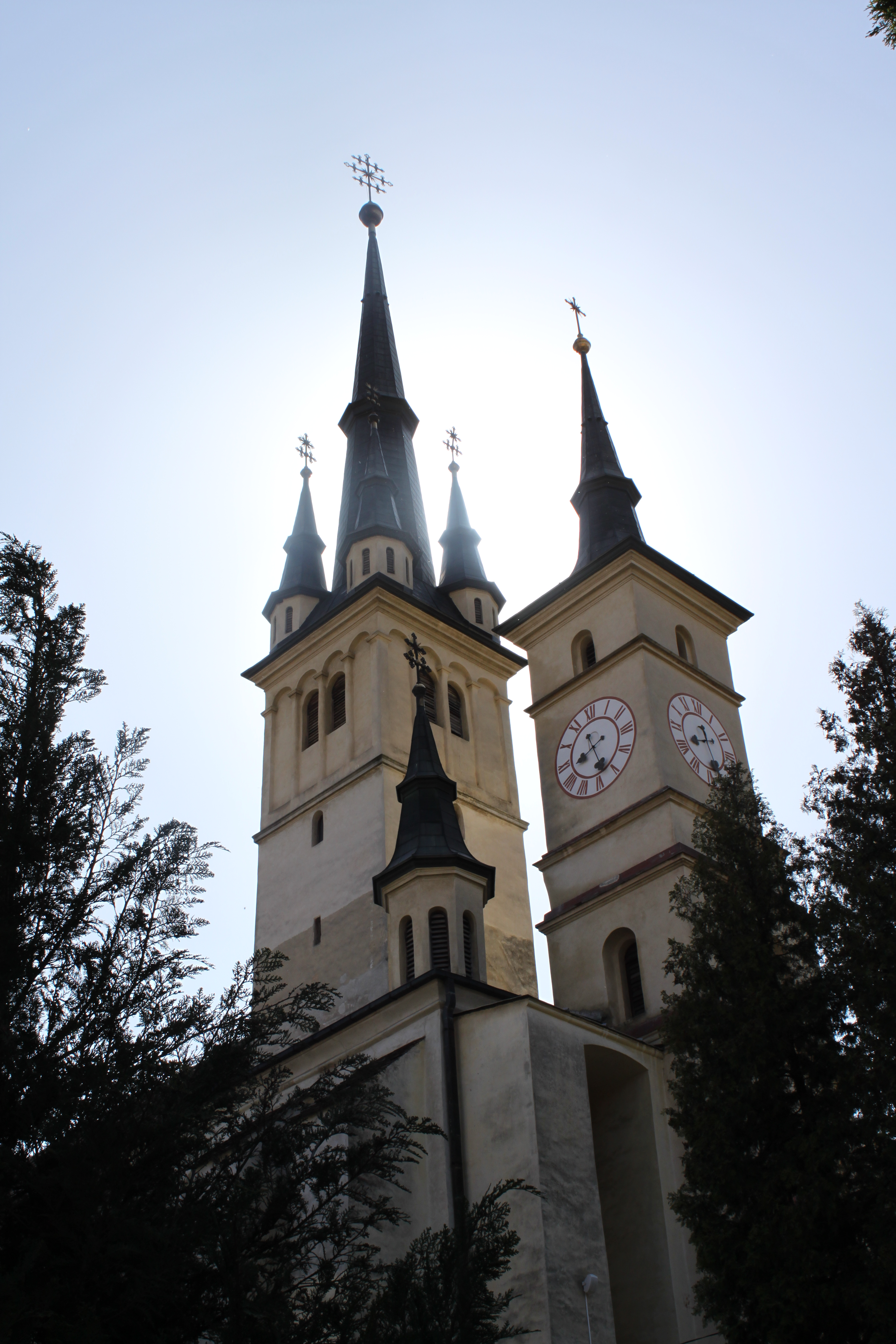
St. Nicholas Church

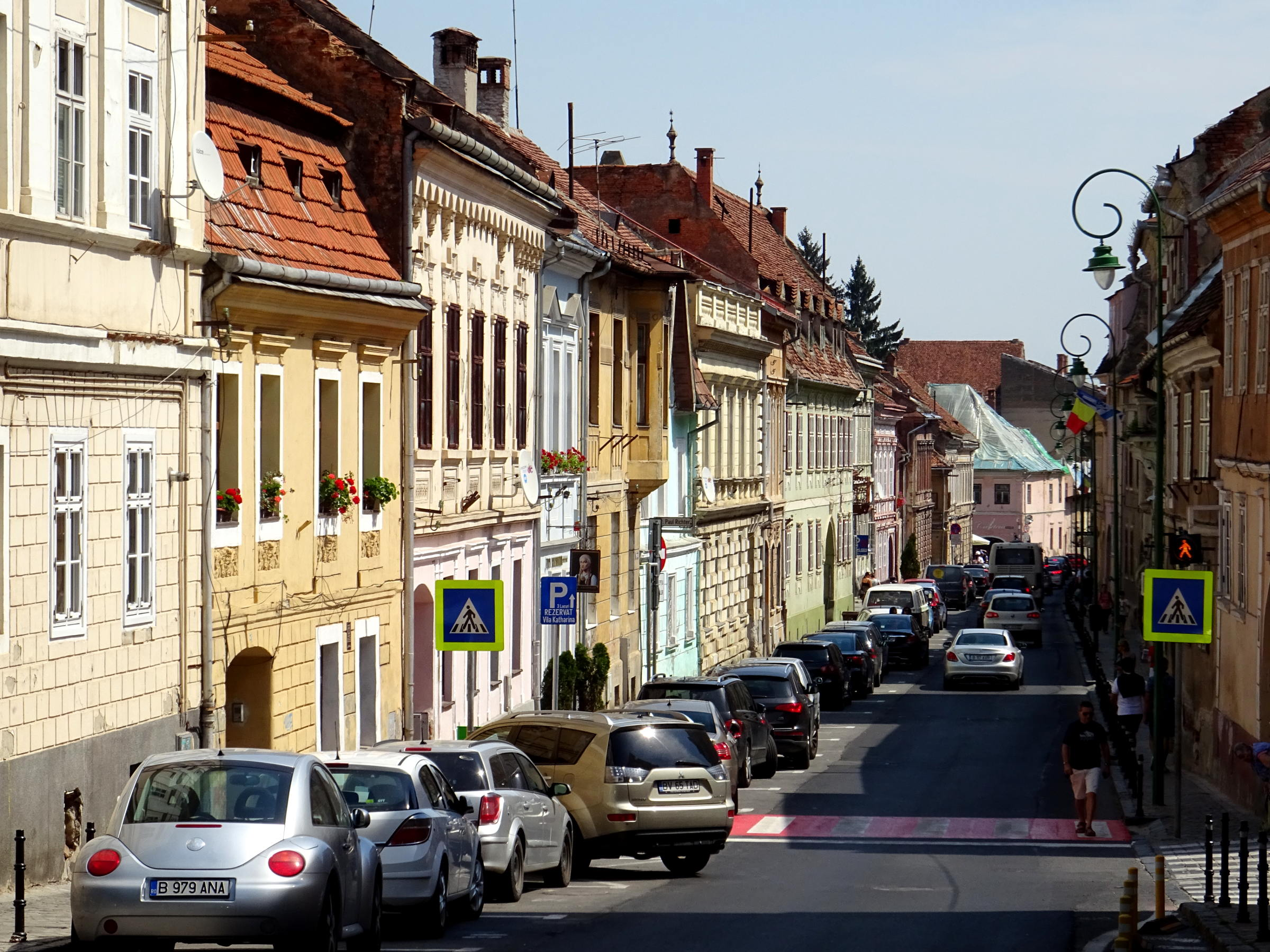
Old Town street

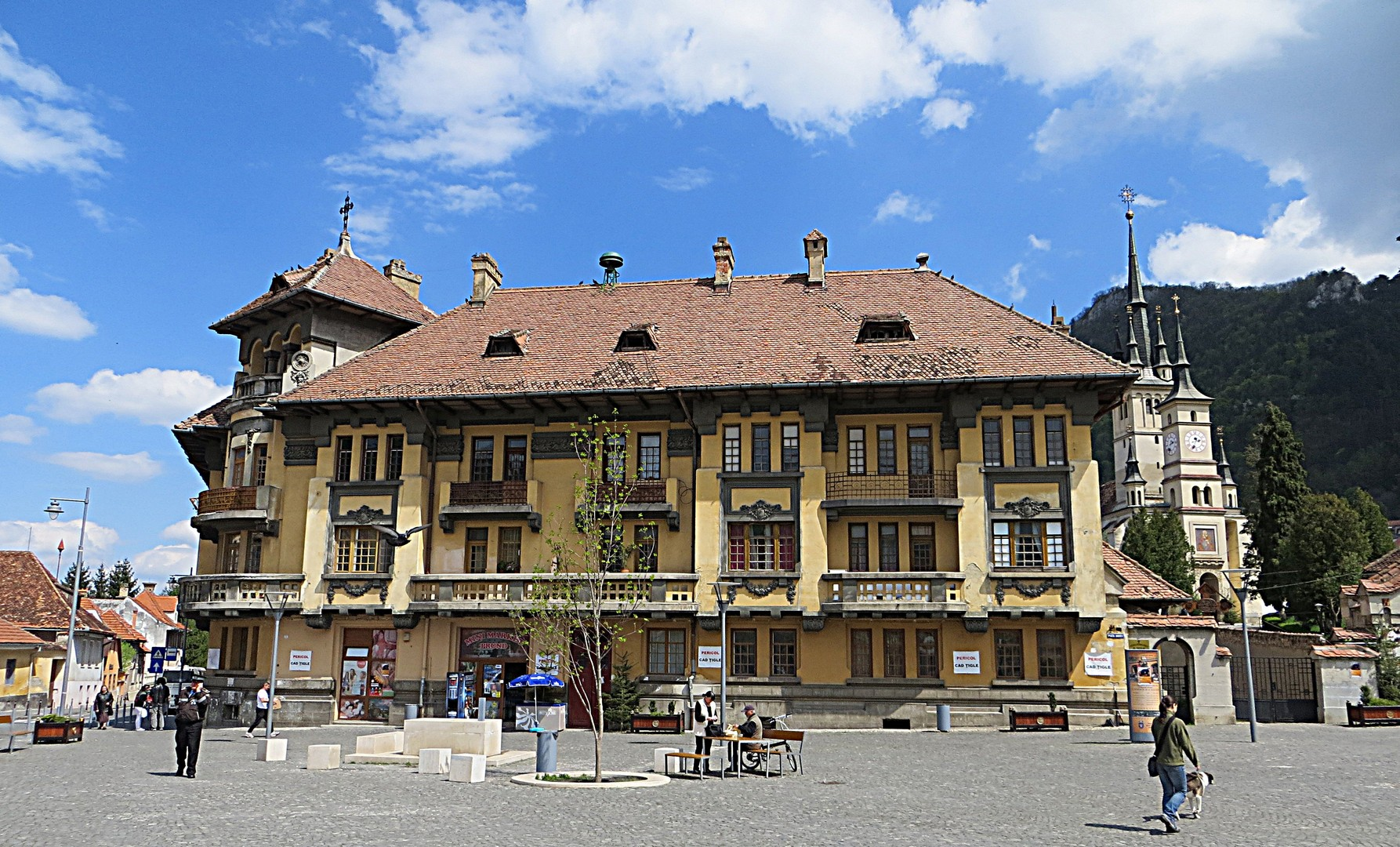
Union Square (Piața Unirii)

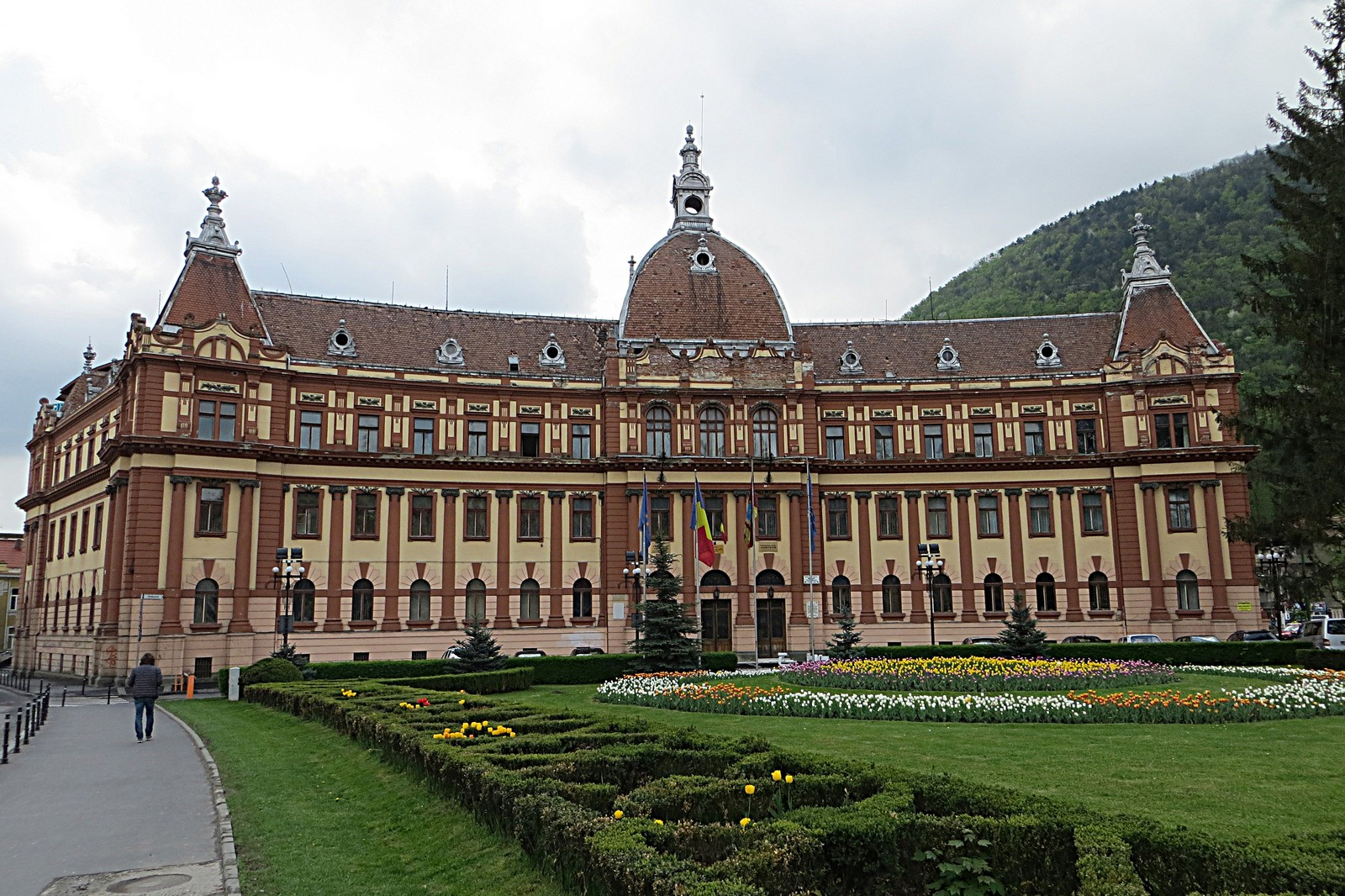
Brașov County Prefecture

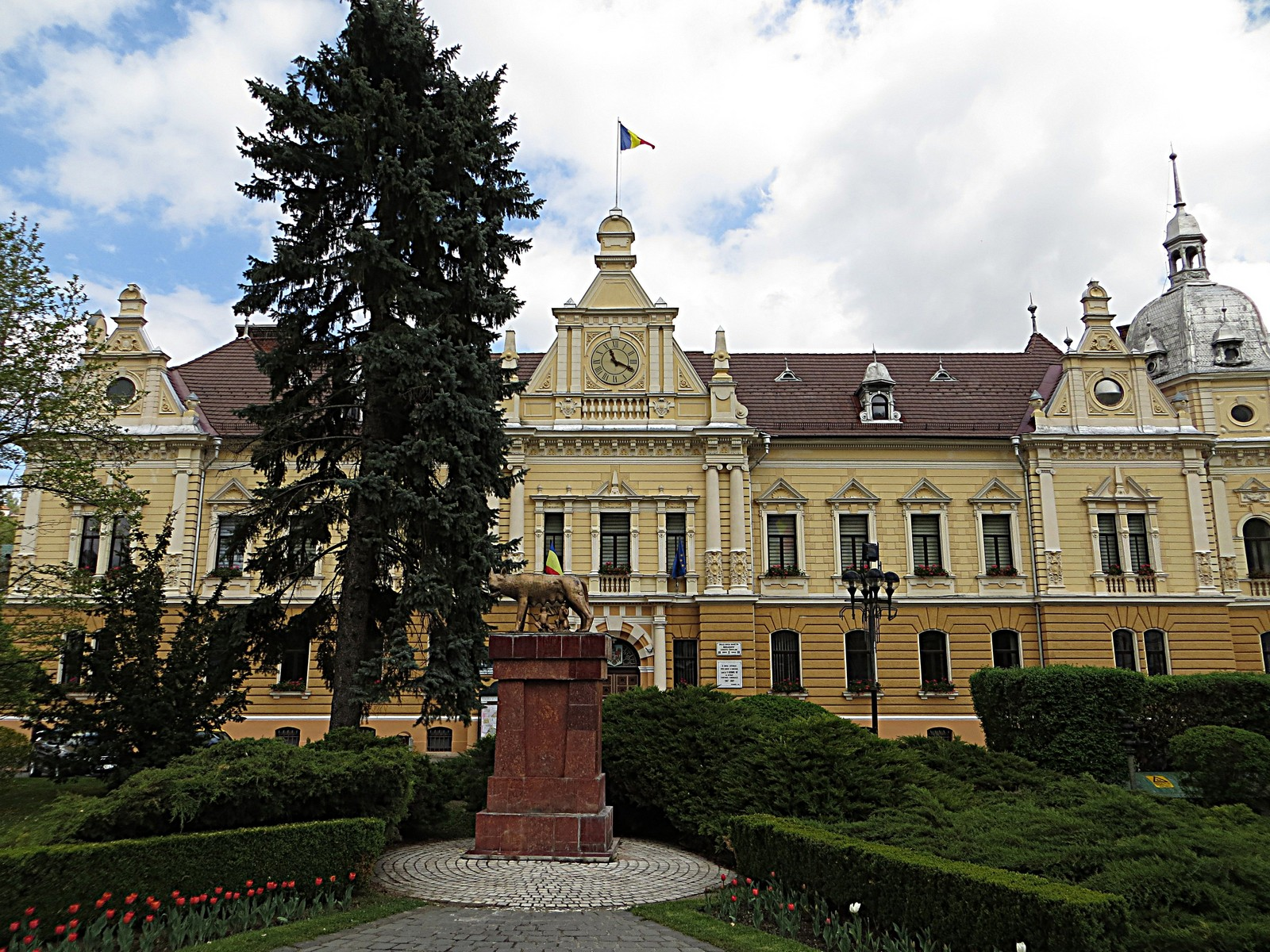
City Hall

== Sport ==
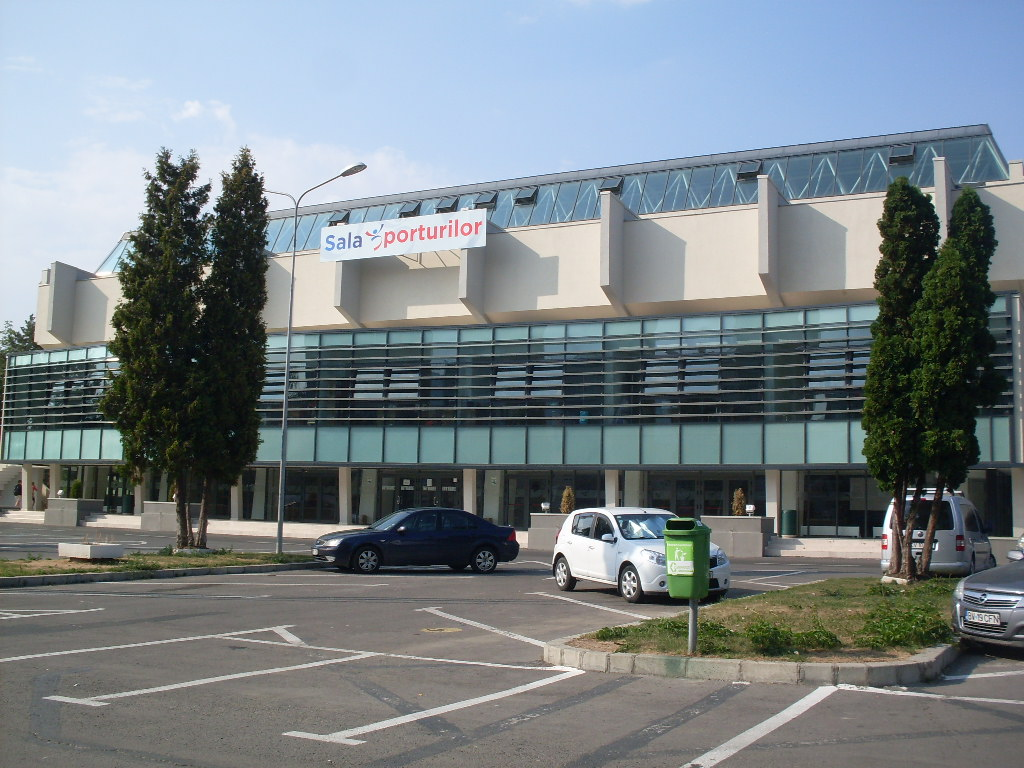
Brașov Sports Hall

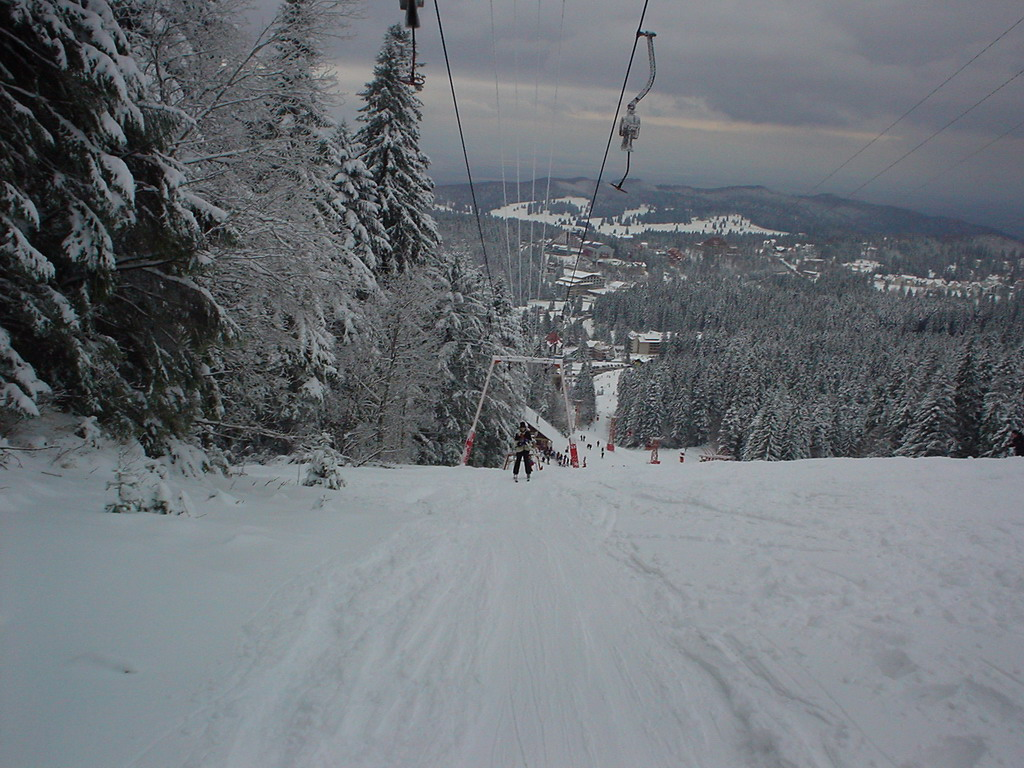
Ski slope in Poiana Brașov

The city has a long tradition in sports, the first sport associations being established at the end of the 19th century (Target shooting Association, Gymnastics School). The Transylvanian Sports Museum is among the oldest in the country and presents the evolution of consecrated sports in the city. During the communist period, universiades and Daciads were held, where local sportsmen were obliged to participate. Nowadays, the infrastructure of the city allows other sports to be practiced, such as football, rugby, tennis, cycling, handball, gliding, skiing, skating, mountain climbing, paintball, bowling, swimming, target shooting, basketball, martial arts, equestrian, volleyball or gymnastics. Annually, at "Olimpia" sports ground, the "Brașov Challenge Cup" tennis competition is held.

Colțea Brașov was the football champion in 1928, managing a second place in 1927, in its only 10 years of existence (1921–1931). It was succeeded by Brașovia Brașov.

Between 17 and 22 February 2013, the city hosted the 2013 European Youth Winter Olympic Festival.

As of 2012, Brașov is hosting two trail semi-marathons: the Semimaraton Intersport Brașov (held in April) and the Brașov International Marathon (held in April or May).

In November 2013, Brașov submitted their bid for the 2020 Winter Youth Olympics. They were up against Lausanne, Switzerland to be awarded the event. In December that year, the city was signed the Youth Olympic Game Candidature Procedure. The host city was to be announced in July 2015, in which Lausanne was selected.

=== Local teams ===
- SR Brașov – football club
- ASC Corona Brașov – football club, women's handball and ice hockey club
- CSU Brașov – basketball team
- CFR Brașov – rugby football club

=== Sports venues ===
• Under construction

• Sala Polivalentă (10,059 capacity) – under construction multi-purpose 10,059-seat indoor arena

- Planned
  - Brașov Arena (23,000 seats) – planned football stadium on the site of the former Municipal Stadium
- Existing
  - Silviu Ploeșteanu Stadium (8,500 seats) – built in 1960 for football, floodlights were installed in 2009
  - Dumitru Popescu Colibași Sports Hall (2,300 seats) – built around 1970 for indoor sports: handball, basketball, volleyball, sometimes others
  - Brașov Olympic Ice Rink (2,000 capacity: 1,600 seated, 400 standing) – inaugurated on February 18, 2010, used mainly for ice hockey and public skating
- Demolished
  - Municipal Stadium (30,000 capacity) – built in 1975, used for 1 May and 23 August parades, rarely used for football matches (demolished in 2008)
- Others
  - Paradisul Acvatic – aquatic complex with 40 m long swimming pool and three jumping platform (1 m, 3 m, 5.20 m)

=== Notable events ===
- Tess Rally Brașov – The local round in the Romanian Rally Championship
- BRD Brașov Challenger – A tennis tournament, part of the ATP Challenger Tour
- Braşov International Marathon – Marathon – 42 km Course, Half-Marathon – 21 km Course 10,7 km & Team Run + 5,7 km Course

== Media ==
The city of Brașov is home to several local media publications such as Transilvania Express, Monitorul Express, Bună Ziua Brașov or Brașovul Tău. Also, several local television stations exist, such as RTT, MIX TV and Nova TV.

== Twin towns – sister cities ==
Brașov is twinned with:

- Bijeljina, Republika Srpska / Bosnia and Herzegovina
- Cleveland, United States
- Győr, Hungary
- Holstebro, Denmark
- Linz, Austria
- Musashino, Japan
- Rishon LeZion, Israel
- Tampere, Finland
- Tours, France
- Trikala, Greece

== Gallery ==
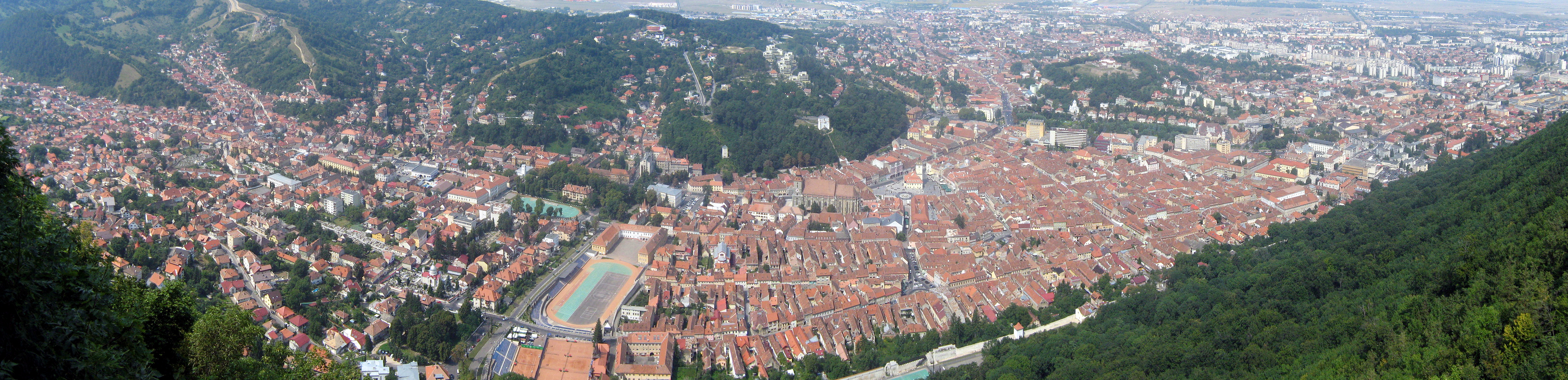
Panoramic view of Brașov from Tâmpa Mountain
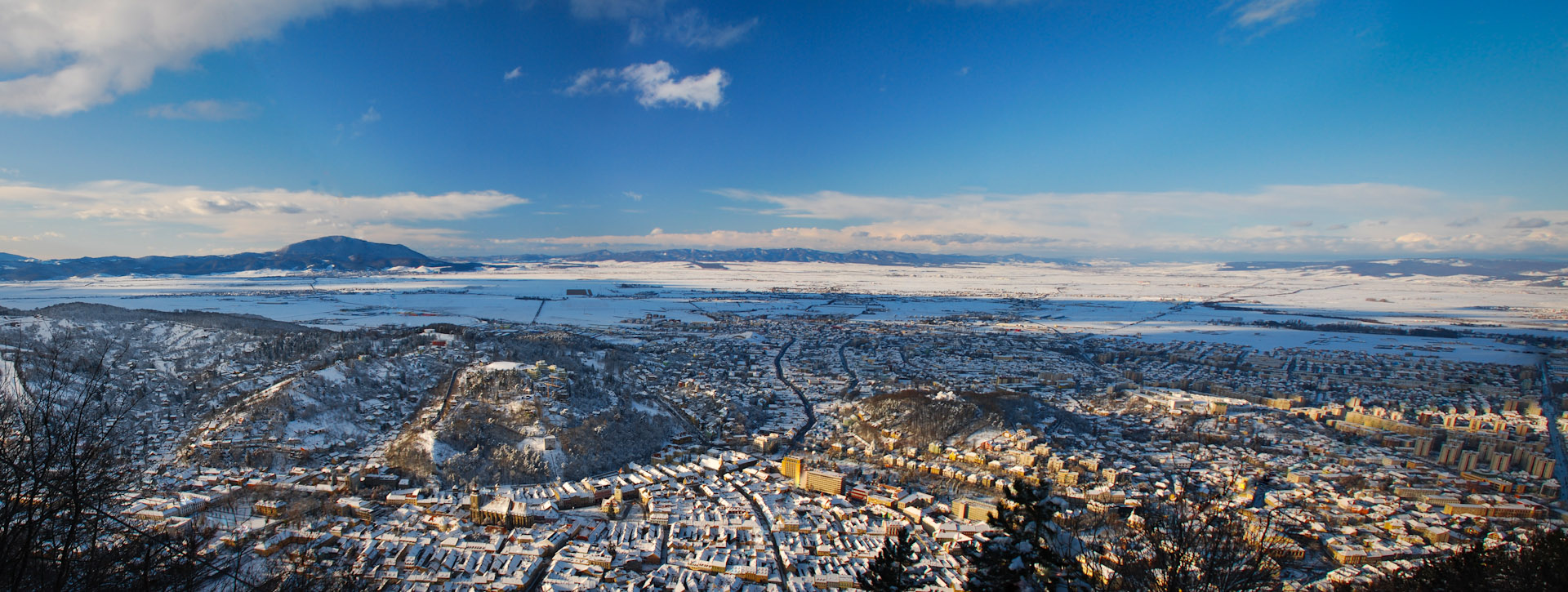
Brașov in winter

== See also ==
- Poiana Brașov
- List of people from Brașov
- List of mayors of Brașov
