= List of people from Brașov =

This is a list of people from Brașov, Romania.

- Ursula Ackrill
- Andreea Adespii
- Violeta Andrei
- Lajos Áprily
- Teodor Axentowicz
- Liviu Cornel Babeș
- Ștefan Baciu
- Maria Baiulescu
- Bálint Bakfark
- Stephan Bergler
- Ilie Birt
- Marcian Bleahu
- Gheorghe Bogdan-Duică
- Friedrich von Bömches
- Brassaï
- Mihai Brediceanu
- Marius Brenciu
- Ștefan Câlția
- Henri Catargi
- Tudor Ciortea
- Coresi
- Doina Cornea
- Melania Cristescu
- Mihai Damian
- Béla Dáner
- Dorin Dănilă
- Margarete Depner
- Gheorghe Dima
- Caius Dobrescu
- Delia Duca
- Hans Eder
- Hermann Fabini
- Wilhelm Fabini
- Rudolf Fischer
- Alexandru Emanoil Florescu
- Gheorghe Marin Fontanin
- Elena Gaja
- Teodora Gheorghiu
- Gustav Gräser
- Valentin Greissing
- Wolfgang Güttler
- Johannes Honter
- Ștefan Octavian Iosif
- József Koszta
- Constantin Lecca
- Aleksandar Lifka
- Peter Maffay
- George Marinescu
- Hans Mattis-Teutsch
- Ioan Meșotă
- Friedrich Miess
- Gabriela and Mihaela Modorcea, twin sisters comprising the duo Indiggo
- Lula Mysz-Gmeiner
- Liviu-Dieter Nisipeanu
- Mișu Popp
- Dumitru Prunariu
- Sextil Pușcariu
- Dorina N. Rusu
- Lily Sharon, née Zimerman, second wife of Ariel Sharon (his first wife, Margalit, was sister of Lily)
- Adrian Stoica
- Laura Taler
- Nicolae Teclu
- Christian Tell
- Ion Țiriac
- Vladimir Tismăneanu
- Adele Zay
- László Zsidó

== See also ==
- List of mayors of Brașov
