= Tocile Church =

Heritage site in Brașov County, Romania

Coordinates: 45°37′53″N 25°34′31″E

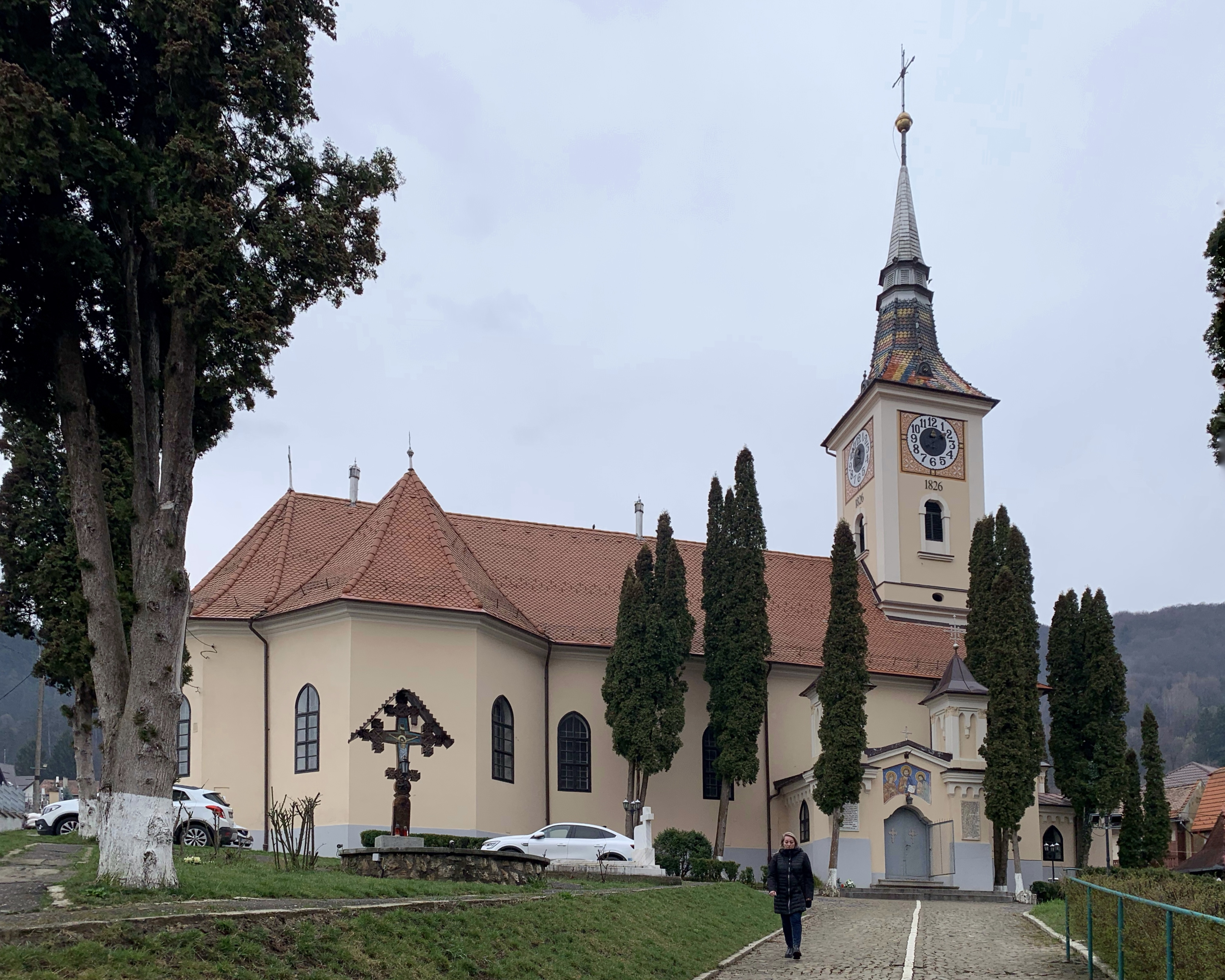
Tocile Church

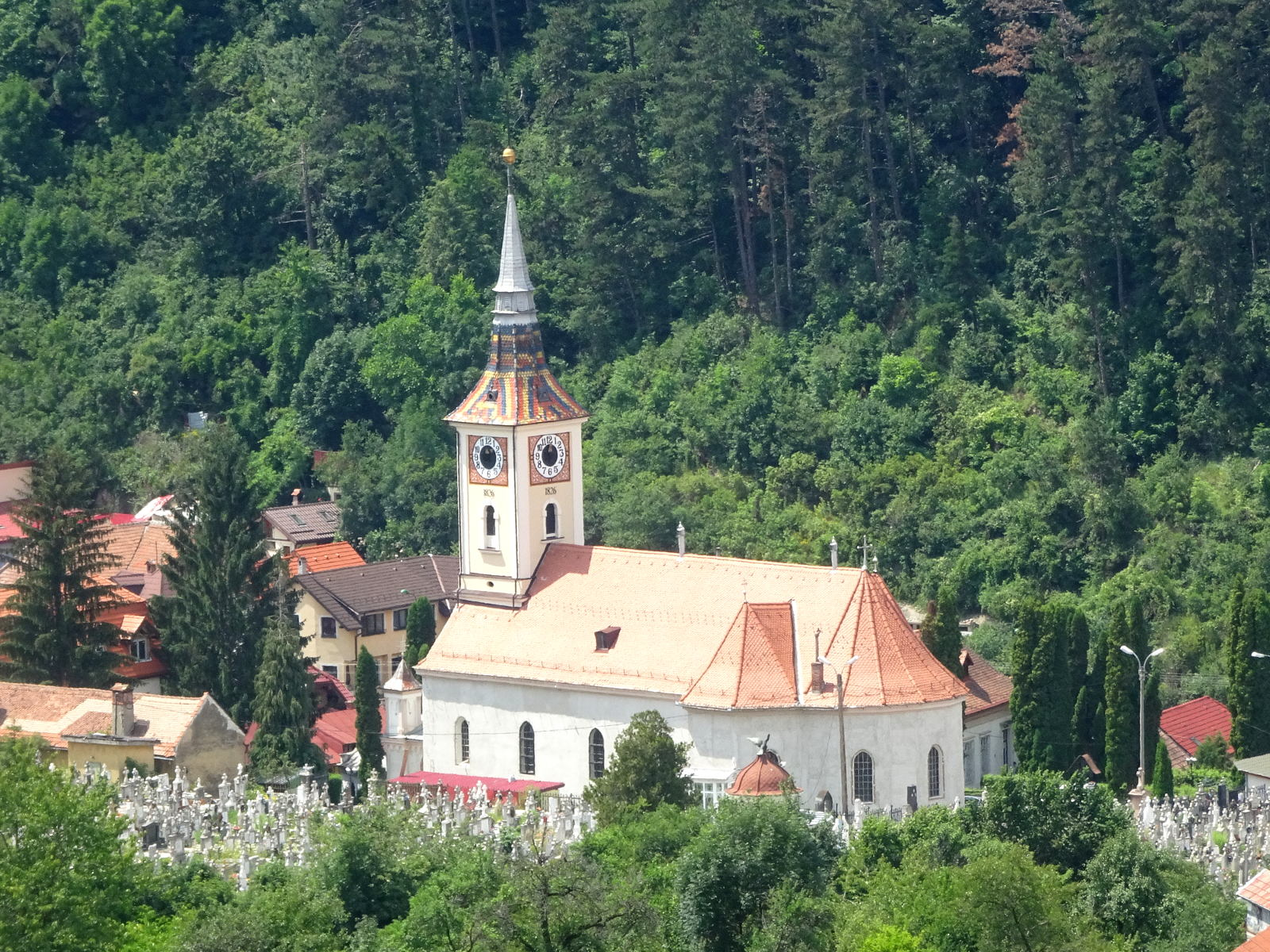
Panoramic view of the church

The Tocile Church is a Romanian Orthodox church located at 57 Vasile Saftu Street, Brașov, Romania. Located in the Tocile section of Șcheii Brașovului, it is dedicated to the Holy Trinity.

In the late 18th century, there were over 1,000 Orthodox families in Șchei, all assigned to St. Nicholas Church. After numerous petitions, the residents of the Tocile area were permitted to build a chchurch in 1812. Construction began in 1824, with the ktetor list being headed by Grigore IV Ghica, Prince of Wallachia. Completed the following year, the church was consecrated in 1831 by Bishop Vasile Moga. In 1855, when the parish numbered 1,395 members, repairs were done on the roof, façade, and cemetery walls, to which gates were added in 1860.

The church is in Gothic Revival style, its central nave of stone and brick measuring 35 by 11.5 meters at the apses and 32 meters high. The clock on the spire dates to 1857 and cost 600 florins, donated by two Bucharest families. The church was painted during the same year: Constantin Lecca did the altar murals, while Mișu Popp is attributed part of the iconostasis and the rest of the church. Only a small area above the north door was painted later. The ensemble was restored in 1945–1946 and again in 2001–2003.

The nearby graveyard features old crosses and the resting places of prominent locals, including the linguist Constantin Lacea and the composer Tudor Ciortea. The poet Andrei Mureșanu lay there until 1883, when his remains were moved to the more central Groaveri Cemetery. The church is listed as a historic monument by Romania's Ministry of Culture and Religious Affairs, as are the 1781 parish house and the cemetery.
