= Magheru =

Magheru may refer to several entities in Romania:

- Gheorghe Magheru, revolutionary
- Bulevardul Magheru, street in Bucharest
- George Magheru, poet and playwright, grandson of Gheorghe
- Darie Magheru, poet and theatre actor
- Magheru, a village in Breznița-Ocol Commune, Mehedinți County
