= Badian =

Badian may refer to:

- Badian, Cebu, Philippines
- Ernst Badian (1925–2011), Austrian classical scholar
- Elyakim Badian (1923–2000), Israeli politician
- Maya Badian (born 1945), Romanian-born Canadian composer, musicologist, and professor
- Badian, a spice from Illicium verum tree
