= Elise Popovici =

Elise Popovici Goia (11 May 1921 - 25 Jul 2011) was a Romanian composer, conductor, pianist, and teacher who composed in many genres, including music for marionette theater. Her compositions were influenced by Romanian folk music. She was known professionally as Elise Popovici.

== Biography ==
Popovici was born in Suceava, Romania.

She studied music first in Suceava, then at the Iași Conservatory, where she graduated in 1947 then pursued further studies in Bucharest. Her teachers included Constantin Bugeanu, Antonin Ciolan, Elisa Ciolan, Tudor Ciortea, Paul Constantinescu, Constantin Georgescu, August Karnet, Ada Năsturel, George Pascu, and Zena Vancea.

Popovici worked as a pianist for the Bucharest Choreography School, the Iași Conservatory, the Iași Philharmonic Orchestra, the Iași State Opera, and the Romanian National Opera in Bucharest. She was a conductor for the Romanian Broadcasting Society and a researcher at the Constantin Brăiloiu Folklore Institute in Bucharest. From 1961 to 1985, she was an associate professor of music at the George Enescu Conservatory in Iași.

In a 2013 article in Studies in Musicology, Loredana Viorica Iațeșen characterized Popovici’s music as "A synthesis of folkloric elements and features of the late Romantic and Neoclassical languages, also reaching the occasional use of atonality.”

== Works ==
Popovici’s works included:

=== Chamber music ===
- Ballad (cello and piano)
- Rhapsody (two oboes and English horn)
- Sonata (cello and piano)
- Sonata (clarinet and piano)
- Sonata (viola and piano)
- Sonata (violin and piano)
- Suite (string quartet)
- Wind Quintet

=== Orchestral music ===
- Two symphonies

=== Piano music ===
- Five Romanian Folk Dances
- Sonatina No. 1
- Toccata

=== Theatrical music ===
- incidental music for marionette theatre

=== Vocal music ===
- “Forest Whistle” (text by Mihai Eminescu)
- “Gold and Silver” (text by Eugen Jebeleanu)
- Haramoursh Suite of Folk Songs (two voices and orchestra or piano)
- “Lullaby” (text by Otilia Cazimir)
