= Otilia Cazimir =

Romanian poet, prose writer, translator and publicist

- Alexandra Gavrilescu
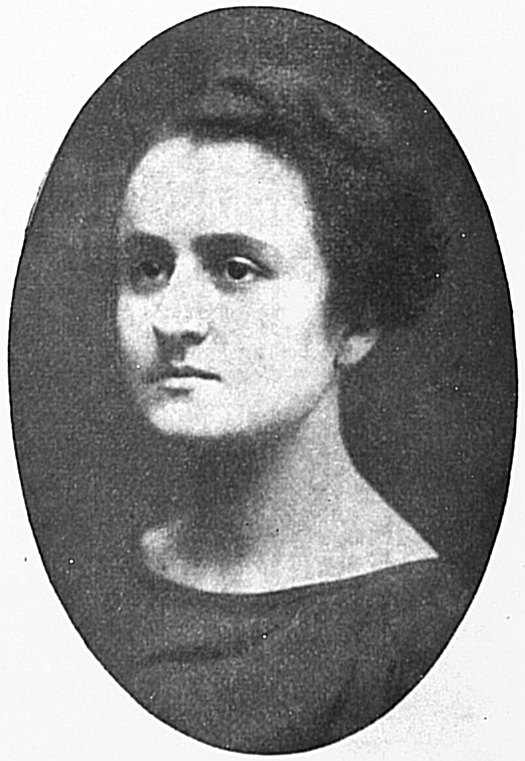
- Born: February 12, 1894; Cotu Vameș, Neamț County, Romania
- Died: June 8, 1967; Iași, Iași County, Romania
- Resting place: Eternitatea cemetery, Iași
- Education: Alexandru Ioan Cuza University
- Occupations: Poet, prose writer, translator, publicist
- Writing career
- Pen name: Otilia Cazimir
- Language: Romanian
- Genres: Poetry, prose
- Subject: Children's poems
- Notable works: Lumini și umbre, Fluturi de noapte, Cântec de comoară

Otilia Cazimir (pen name of Alexandra Gavrilescu; February 12, 1894 – June 8, 1967) was a Romanian poet, prose writer, translator and publicist, nicknamed the "poetess of gentle souls", known as a children's poems author.

== Biography ==
=== Origins and early work ===
Born in Cotu Vameș, Neamț County, she was the fifth child of schoolteachers Gheorghe Gavrilescu and his wife Ecaterina (née Petrovici). She attended middle and high school in Iași and took courses at the University of Iași's literature and philosophy faculty, but did not graduate. Her pen name, which she never liked, was selected by her mentors, Mihail Sadoveanu and Garabet Ibrăileanu: the former came up with "Otilia", the latter with "Cazimir". She was quoted as saying: "Allow me to confess to you, after so many years, that this name, that I still bore in dignity, I never liked. I have nothing in common with the heroines of German legends, and the first Otilia that I have ever met, the little girl I shared a school bench in first grade, was stupid, fat and pimply...". She is known to have also utilised other pen names, such as Alexandra Casian, Ofelia, Magda or Dona Sol, which she used to sign in the press, particularly her more "feminist" works.

In 1912, she made her debut with poems in Viața Românească, to which she remained a loyal contributor. Other magazines that published her work include Însemnări ieșene, Adevărul literar și artistic, Lumea, Bilete de Papagal, Iașul nou, Iașul literar, Orizont, Gazeta literară and Cronica. Her first book was the 1923 poetry volume Lumini și umbre, followed by Fluturi de noapte (1926) and Cântec de comoară (1931).

Cazimir's poems focus on the universe becoming domestic, while in its turn, the domestic perpetuates the cosmic. Her prose books were Din întuneric. Fapte și întâmplări adevărate. Din carnetul unei doctorese (1928), Grădina cu amintiri și alte schițe (1929), În târgușorul dintre vii... (1939); she also authored a novel, A murit Luchi... (1942). Some of these works include poetic sketches reminiscent of Antoine de Saint-Exupéry or Colette, while others are in a more realist vein. Cazimir worked as inspector-general of theaters in the Moldavia region from 1937 to 1947. She was involved in a discreet, years-long relationship with the married poet George Topîrceanu.

=== Communist period and legacy ===
Cazimir won the Romanian Academy's prize in 1927, the Femina Prize (1928), the national prize for poetry (1937) and the Romanian Writers' Society prize (1942). She was a successful children's writer (Jucării, 1938; Baba Iarna intră-n sat, 1954), and published her memoirs as Prietenii mei scriitori... in 1960. Her poetry dated after 1944, when the Romanian Communist Party began its ascent to power, is often marked by prevailing socialist realist norms; the communist regime awarded her the Order of Labor in 1954. Some of her poems were set to music by composers such as Rodica Sutzu and Elise Popovici.

Cazimir translated French literature (Guy de Maupassant) as well as Russian and Soviet (Maxim Gorky, Aleksandr Kuprin, Anton Chekhov, Konstantin Fedin, Arkady Gaidar). Finding her standard poems to be "typically feminine", Eugen Lovinescu labeled her as "gracious and minor". She died in Iași; her house there has been a museum since 1972, and includes the office where she wrote, portraits and local landscapes, her eyeglasses and inkwell, manuscripts and a library replete with signed books.

She died in Iași in 1967, and was buried at the city's Eternitatea Cemetery.

=== Poems ===
- Lumini și umbre, Viața Românească Publishing, Iași, 1923;
- Fluturi de noapte, Cartea Românească Publishing, București, 1926;
- Cântec de comoară, "Naționala" S. Ciornei Publishing, București, 1931;
- Jucării, București, 1938;
- Poezii, "Regele Carol II" Literature and Art Foundation, București, 1939;
- Catinca și Catiușa, două fete din vecini (in collaboration with Th. Kiriacoff-Suruceanu), Cartea Rusă Publishing, București, 1947;
- Stăpânul lumii, Cartea Rusă Publishing, București, 1947;
- Alb și negru (in collaboration Th. Kiriacoff-Suruceanu), Cartea Rusă Publishing, București, 1949;
- Baba Iarna intră-n sat, Tineretului Publishing, București, 1954;
- Poezii, „Regele Carol II” Literature and Art Foundation, București, 1956;
- Versuri, preface by Const. Ciopraga, Editura de Stat pentru Literatură si Artă, București, 1957;
- Poezii, București, 1959;
- Partidului de ziua lui, București, 1961;
- Poezii (1928-1963), preface by Const. Ciopraga, București, Tineretului Publishing, 1964;
- Cele mai frumoase poezii, preface Const. Ciopraga, București, Tineretului Publishing, 1965;
- Poezii, Ion Creangă Publishing, București, 1975;
- Ariciul împărat, Ion Creangă Publishing, 1985
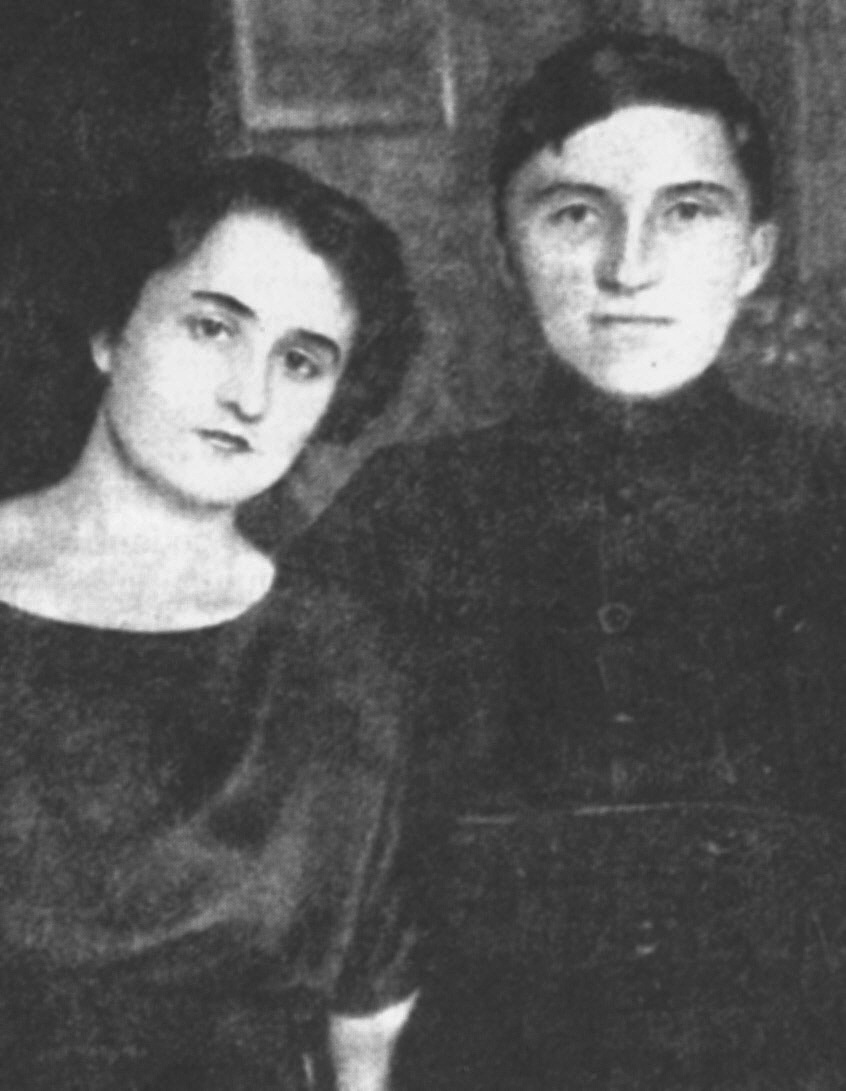
Cazimir and George Topîrceanu

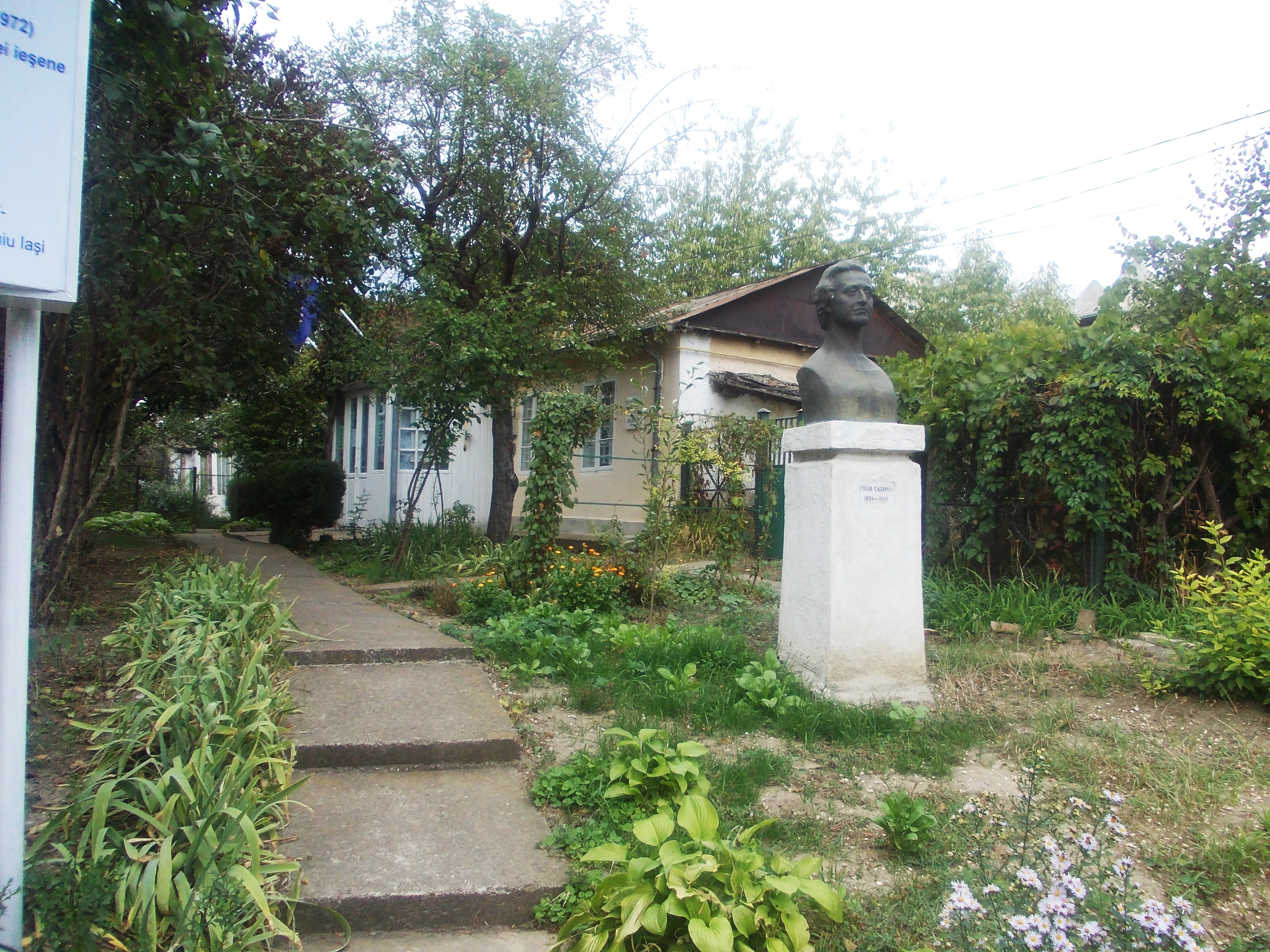
Cazimir's house in Iași
