= Marcian Bleahu =

Romanian geologist and politician (1924–2019)

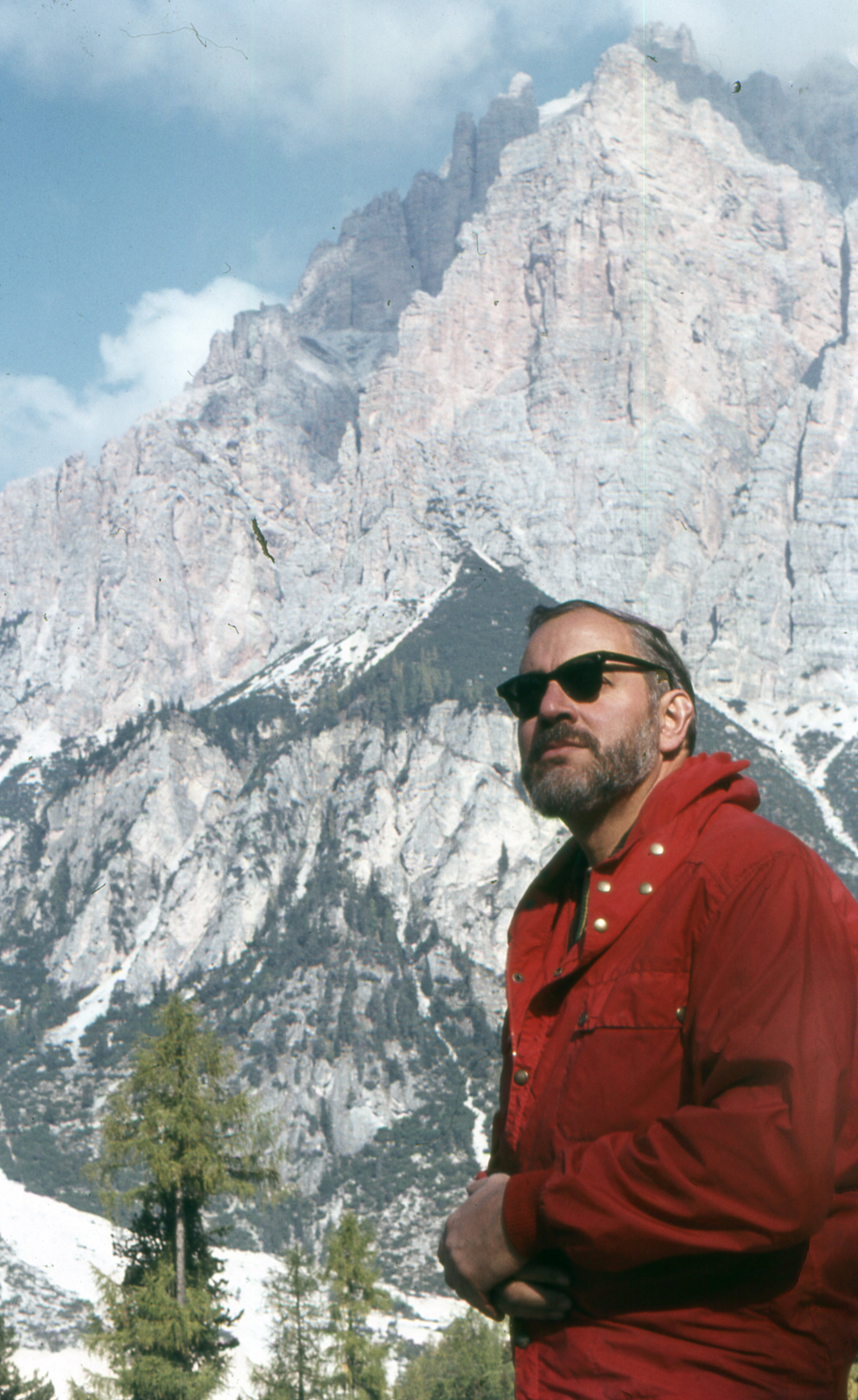
Marcian David (Matty) Bleahu

Marcian David (Matty) Bleahu (14 March 1924, in Brașov – 30 July 2019, in Bucharest) was a Romanian geologist, speleologist, geographer, alpinist, explorer, writer and politician. He is well known for his scientific contributions to the development of the theories of global tectonics (applied to the study of the geology of the Carpathian Mountains), for his pioneering in speleology and for the development of this science, but also for the popularization of science and of ecology in Romania.

Bleahu was the author of more than 41 books and 126 scientific papers, of more than 400 articles on different topics. He had more than 500 public appearances as a speaker, including the radio and the television; he was a pioneer in using the multimedia in conferences and was the author of the first geological map of Romania. As such, Bleahu was one of the most important Romanian scientific personalities of the second half of the last century. His books and his conferences have inspired generations of youth fond of nature, mountains, the exploration of the caves in Romania, and he has been, at the same time, a mentor for many Romanian geologists after the Second World War.

== Biography ==
Marcian David Bleahu was born on March 14, 1924, in Brașov, in the family of a notary, but his maternal ancestry goes up to the prince Constantin Brâncoveanu. He was enlisted during the World War II. He graduated from elementary school and the Ioan Meșotă High School in Brașov. In 1949, he graduated from the Faculty of Sciences (Sections of Natural Sciences and Geography) of the University of Bucharest. In 1974 he obtained a PhD with a thesis about the Geology and the Morphology of the Karst and of the Caves, at the University of Cluj.

He began his teaching activity at the Geology Department of Bucharest University, where he was a teaching assistant, lecturer and associate professor between 1949 and 1961. He was eliminated from the teaching system for political reasons, and he started again his university career after 1989, when, together with prof. Dolfi Drimer, he founded the Ecological University, where he was appointed as Dean of the Faculty of Natural Sciences (afterwards transformed in the Faculty of Ecology). Between 1949 and 1994, Bleahu worked as a geologist, a researcher and as a manager (including General Manager) at the Geological Institute of Romania.

He was elected to the Senate of Romania for the legislatures from 1990 to 1992 and 1996 to 2000, on the lists of the Romanian Ecologist Movement, and of the Romanian Ecologist Federation. Between 1991 and 1992 he was the Minister of the Environment.

He received several awards and decorations; in 2008 he was decorated with the Order "Steaua României" ("The Star of Romania") as Knight, which is the highest Romanian civil order. After he retired from public activity, he continued to write articles and books in several fields, including music (he was known as a sophisticated melomaniac) and ecology.

== Professional career ==
After graduation, in 1949, Marcian Bleahu joined the Geology Department of the University of Bucharest, where he taught the courses of Structural Geology and of the Geology of the Quaternary. In 1961 he is eliminated from the Department by the communist administration, on political grounds.

On April 4, 1990, together with Dolphi Drimer, Marcian Bleahu founded the Ecological University, the first private university in Romania and the only university with an ecological profile. Drimer became the rector of this university and Bleahu was appointed as dean of the Faculty of Natural Sciences (later on named Faculty of Ecology), where he taught Dynamic Geology, Physical Geography of Romania, Geology of Romania, Protection of nature and protected areas. He ended his teaching career in 2001. Between 1949 and 1994, simultaneously with his teaching activity, Bleahu worked as a geologist at the Geological Institute, where he implemented most of his scientific activities.

Between 1952 and 1985, he did a long series of research in the Carpathian Mountains, mainly in the Apuseni Mountains. During all these 33 years of field research, he synthesized and made public the stratigraphy and the structure of the Apuseni Mountains. The papers he published in this field are the first scientific source about the geology of the Maramureș, Bihor, Codru-Moma, and Metaliferic Mountains; he dedicated to each of them a monography. These research activities had an important impact on synthesis of national interest, such as coal deposits, Paleozoic and Mesozoic formations, but also from the tectonic point of view, in the general works about the structure of the territory, as well as in the integration of these researches in the wider framework of the study of Triassic paleography in Eastern Europe. Directly, or by coordinating teams of geologists, Bleahu also produced over 50 maps (pages) component of the Geological Map of Romania, on a scale of 1:200.000, for which he also made the state standards in the field.

A special chapter of this field activity was the study of karstology, meaning the exploration, the mapping and the research of the caves in the Apuseni Mountains, almost unknown until then: Peștera de la Căput, Peștera Buciumul Sucit, Peștera Vântului, Peștera Vadu Crișului, Peștera Șura Mare, Peștera din Peretele Dârnini, Peștera Coliboaia, Avenul de sub Pietruța, Peștera Izvorul Tăușoarelor, Peștera-aven ghețarul de sub Zgurăști, Peștera Cetatea Rădesei, Peștera Pojarul Poliței, Scărișoara Cave, Peștera Huda lui Papară, Vânătările Ponorului, Izbucul de la Cotețul Dobreștilor, Avenul de sub Colții Grindului, Peștera Gaura cu Muscă, Peștera Bolii, Peștera Neagră, Peștera Ghețarul de la Vârtop, Avenul din Piatra Ceții, Peștera Calului, Peștera Bisericuța, Peștera din Dealul Cornului, Peștera Mică de la Vânătare, Peștera Dâlbina, Peștera Corobana lui Gârtău, Peștera V5, Peștera Poarta lui Ionele, Avenul din Șesuri etc.

In 1976 he published Caves from Romania "Peșteri din România", which became one of the first scientific best-sellers in Romania.

All these researches, as well as the world scientific trends of the 1960s in the field of plate tectonics catalyses Marcian Bleahu's research activity and he becomes a pioneer in the field of global tectonics not only in Romania, but also with significant contributions in the international scientific community. The results of his studies were synthesized in the book Global tectonics - Bucharest, 1983, Editura Științifică, (Tectonica globală), in two volumes, with over 1000 pages.

Despite the opposition of the scientific world of that time, which got quickly past any debate over ideas and arrived at the political questioning of the research results (the communist authorities forbade him to leave the country for 6 years, 1978 to 1984), Bleahu managed to thrust his theories, and he was invited in 1974, 1976, and 1978 to teach at the University of Geneva the first course in Global Tectonics; he also gave conferences in Vienna, Zurich, Freiburg, Basel, Potsdam, etc.

Between 1949 and 1952 he was the manager of the geology service for the Danube–Black Sea Canal. In 1953, he coordinated the geological research for the project of Bucharest Metro. He was a member of the inter-ministerial commission of analysis for the 1977 Vrancea earthquake. Between 1985 and 1994 he was a member of the team that founded and coordinated the National Museum of Geology in Bucharest.

== Political career ==
While a student, he sympathized with the National Liberal Party, but he was not a member of any political party until 1965, when he joins the Romanian Communist Party. He was recognized by the CNSAS as a collaborator of the former political police of the Romanian communist regime (http://www.cnsas.ro/colaboratori.html).

After the Romanian Revolution of December 1989, Bleahu founded the Ecologist Movement in Romania, thus putting into practice his professional belief regarding the protection of nature and of the environment. He was elected as a senator in May 1990, in the first free post-communist Parliament and he became the Minister of Environment in the Stolojan cabinet. In this position, he elaborated the legislation in the field (again, a pioneering work) and he tried to integrate Romania in the international conventions and programs regarding the environment. In 1992 he was appointed vice-president of the UN Conference for environment and development in Rio de Janeiro. In 1996 he was re-elected as a senator, on the lists of the Democratic Convention, for the Ecologist Federation of Romania. He was a member of the Commission for Foreign Affairs and of the parliamentary group of the National Liberal Party. In 2008 he was appointed as Honorary President of the Green Party, successor of the Ecologist Federation of Romania.

== Medals and awards ==
- The Medal "Scientific Merit", 1966
- The decoration "Order of Labour" cl. III, 1971
- The medal of fighter in the Second World War, 1997
- The decoration "Order of the Star of Romania", Knight rank, 2009
- The medal for merit "Percy Allen" of the European Union of Geology Societies, 2012
- The prize of the Romanian Academy - "Emil Gh. Racoviță", 1965
- The prize of the Romanian Academy - "Grigore Cobălcescu", 1974
- The prize of the Romanian Academy - "G.M. Murgoci", 1976
- Honorary Citizen of Gârda and Albac, 2006 and 2010
- Professor Honoris Causa of Babeș-Bolyai University, Cluj, 2009

== Bibliography ==
Geology:

- Global Tectonics (Tectonica globală), Vol. I, Editura Științifică, 1983
- Global Tectonics (Tectonica globală), Vol. II, Editura Științifică, 1989
- Geology of Romania (Geologia României), Editura UEB, 1994
- General Geology - External Dynamics (Geologie generală – Dinamica externă), Editura UEB, 2002
- General Geology - Internal Dynamics (Geologia generală - Dinamica internă), Editura UEB, 2001
- The earth is confessing to us (Pământul se destăinuie), Editura Ion Creangă, 1985
- Formation of Continents and Oceans (Formarea continentelor și a oceanelor), Editura Științifică, 1978
- The Planet called Earth (Planeta numită Pământ, 4 brochures for diapositives), Editura Animafilm, 1978
- The Crystals of Romania (Cristalele României), in collaboration with I. Miclea, Editura Sport-Turism, 1977

Geography:

- The Beauty of Karstic Regions (Pitorescul regiunilor carstice), Editura SRSC, 1956
- Stone flowers (Flori de piatră), Editura Științifică, 1966
- Karstic Morphology (Morfologia carstică), Editura Științifică, 1974
- Karstic Relief (Relieful carstic), Editura Albatros, 1982
- Physical Geography of Romania (Geografia fizică a României), Editura UEB, 2001
- Beyond the Landscape (Dincolo de peisaj), Editura Paidea, 2007

Speleology:

- The Man and the Cave (Omul și peștera), Editura Sport-Turism, 1978
- Topolnita Cave (Peștera Topolnița), in collaboration with C. Lascu, Editura Sport-Turism, 1975
- The Catalogue of Caves in Romania (Catalogul peșterilor din România), in collaboration with I. Povară, Editura CNSFS, 1976
- The Conquerors of the Darkness (Cuceritorii întunericului), Editura Sport-Turism, 1976
- Bulba Cave (Peștera Bulba), in collaboration with C. Lascu, Editura Sport-Turism, 1985

Ecology:

- Geological Nature Reserves in Romania (Rezervații naturale geologice din România), in collaboration with F. Marinescu and V. Brădescu, Editura Tehnică, 1976
- Ecology - Nature - Man (Ecologie-Natură-Om), Editura Metropol, 1998
- Look Back in Anger... Look Ahead in Terror - Valences of Political Ecology (Privește înapoi cu mânie… privește înainte cu spaimă - Valențele ecologiei politice), Editura Economică, 2001
- Noah's Ark in the XXIst Century (Arca lui Noe în Secolul XXI), Editura Națională, 2004
- Protected Natural Areas in Bucovina (Arii naturale protejate din Bucovina), in collaboration with A. and T. Done, Editura Terra Design, 2007
- Roșia Montană - the prediction of a national tragedy (Roșia Montană – prefigurarea unei tragedii naționale), print, 2013

Tourism and Alpinism:

- Apuseni Mountains (Munții Apuseni), in collaboration with S. Bordea and Al. Borza, Editura ONT, 1963
- Bihor-Vlădeasa Mountains - tourism guide (Munții Bihor-Vlădeasa – ghid turistic), in collaboration with S. Bordea, Editura Sport-Turism, 1967
- Himalaya - Conquering the Giants of the World (Himalaya – cucerirea giganților lumii), in collaboration with M. Bogdan and Gh. Epuran, Editura Științifică, 1966
- Codru-Moma Mountains (Munții Codru-Moma), Editura CNFS, 1978
- Bihor-Vlădeasa Mountains - Monography (Munții Bihor-Vlădeasa – monografie), in collaboration with S. Bordea, Editura Sport-Turism,1981

Miscellaneous:

- The Confession of An Undefeated (Spovedania unui neînvins), Editura Paidea, 2006
- Notes without Stave (Note fără portativ), Editura Paidea, 2011
- The Life and Work of G.M. Murgoci (Viața și opera lui G.M.Murgoci), in collaboration with B. Iancovici (in "G.M.Murgoci – Opere ales" ), published by M. Bleahu and B. Iancovici, Editura Academiei, 1957
- A Course of German Language - texts for geology and geography (Curs de limba germană- texte de geologie și geografie), in collaboration with J. Livescu and A. Savin, 1963
- A Course of German Language - texts for biology (Curs de limba germană – texte de biologie), in collaboration with J. Livescu and A. Savin, 1968
- Fundamental Problems of the Contemporary World (in Geography of the Environment -, Geografia mediului înconjurător"), textbook for the XIth grade, Editura Didactică și Pedagogică, 2002

Co-author in reference works:

- Evolution of the lito-genetic processes (Evoluția proceselor litogenetice), in The Geological Evolution of the Metaliferic Mountains (Evoluția geologică a Munților Metaliferi"), Editura Academiei, (in collaboration with M. Lupu), 1969
- The Structural Position of the Apuseni Mountains in the alpino-carpathian-dinaric system (Poziția structurală a Munților Apuseni în cadrul sistemului alpino-carpato-dinaric), in The Apuseni Mountains ("Munții Apuseni"), Editura Academiei, 1976
- Romanian Carpathians – The Apuseni Mountains (in Tectonics of the Carpathian-Balkan Regions), Editura Geolog. Inst. Dionysz Stur, Bratislava,
- The Caves in Bihor Mountains (Peșterile din Munții Bihor - bazinele Padiș-Cetățile Ponorului, Vălea Galbena, Vălea Gârda și din Bazinul văii Topolnița) in Caves from Romania (Peșteri din România), Editura Științifică,1976
- Caves from Oltenia explored from 1959 to 1962 (Grottes d'Oltenie explores de 1959 a 1962 ), in collaboration with A. and V. Decou, in "Recherche sur les grottes du Banat et d'Oltenie 1959-1962", Editura CNRS, Paris
- Karst of Romania (in the volume published by M. Herak and T. V. Stringfield "Karst, Important karst of the northern hemisphere" ), Editura Elsevier, Amsterdam, 1972
- Palaeokarst of Romania (in the volume published by P. Bosak and D. C. Ford "Paleokarst"), Editura Academia, Praga, 1989
