= Rodica Sutzu =

Romanian composer

Rodica Lucia Sutzu (15 April 1913 – 8 May 1979) was a Romanian composer and pianist who studied with Nadia Boulanger and served as the Romanian Radio piano soloist and master of sound for almost 20 years. She won the George Enesco Composition Prize in 1933, and was awarded the Workers’ Medal in 1953. Her husband was chief of staff of the Romanian Deputy Prime Minister.

== Life ==
Sutzu was born in Iași to Elena Jules Cazaban and Rudolf Sutzu. Her father was a publicist and a descendant of the aristocratic Soutzos family. Her mother came from a family of artists and musicians which included the composer Mansi Barberis. Sutzu married Radu Diamandi Demetrescu, who served as the chief of staff for Romanian Deputy Prime Minister Mihai Antonescu.

Sutzu attended the Iasi Conservatory and the Ecole Normale in Paris. Her teachers included Diran Alexanian, Nadia Boulanger, Aspasia Burada, Alfred Cortot, George Dandelot, Petre Elinescu, Gavriil Galinescu, Blanche Basscouret de Geraldi, Lazare Levy, Sofia Teodoreanu, and Ginette Waldmeyer.

Sutzu was a composer and a pianist. She was the Romanian Radio piano soloist and master of sound from 1937 to 1955, accompanying artists such as Mircea Barsan, George Enesco, and Theodor Lupu, and performing with major orchestras as a soloist. She became a piano professor at the George Enesco Music School in 1959, and lectured at the Bucharest Pedagogic Institute until 1968. She was awarded the George Enesco Composition Prize in 1933, and the Workers’ Medal in 1953.

Her compositions include chamber pieces and piano works. She also wrote three pieces for theatre plays:

== Chamber ==
- Piece, opus 4 (cello and piano)
- Prelude, opus 28 (oboe and piano)

== Piano ==
- Ballad in c minor
- Concert Waltz (two pianos)
- Etude, opus 12
- Five Miniatures, opus 27
- Five Pieces
- Obsession, opus 1
- Perpetuum Mobile, opus 11
- Rondo, opus 13
- Sonata in C Major, opus 7
- Suite, opus 25
- Suite for Children
- Three Nocturnes, opus 10
- Toccata, opus 23
- Two Preludes, opus 5
- Virtelnita, opus 21

== Theatre ==
- Allons y d’un pas Flaneur (play; based on text by L. Delesco)
- Ghici-ghici (puppet theatre; based on text by N. Stroescu)
- Tu Comprendras (play; based on text by E. Peretz)

== Vocal ==
- Ballad (six voices, two pianos, and orchestra)
- Divertisement, opus 22 (chorus)
- “Five Love Songs” (based on text by Armenian troubadours)
- “Gazel, opus 15” (based on text by Mihai Eminescu)
- “Imi Sint Ochii Plini de Soare” (two voices)
- “Prayer, opus 20”
- “Songs to verses of Eminescu and Otilia Cazimir”
- “Three Miniatures, opus 16” (text by Cazimir)
- “Waltz for Voice and Piano, opus 24”
