= Georges Dandelot =

French composer and teacher (1895–1975)

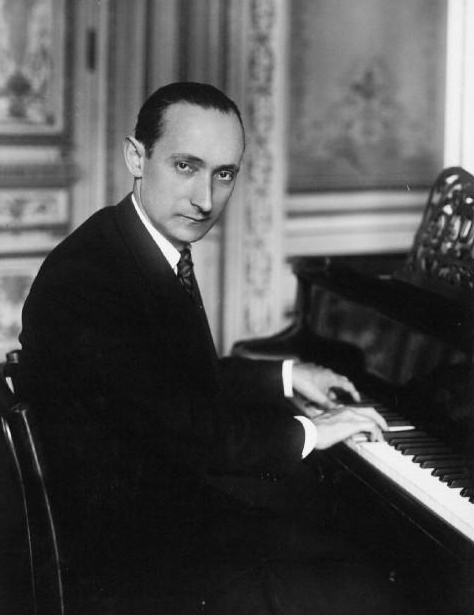
Georges Dandelot et the piano at the École Normale de Musique de Paris in 1925

Georges Édouard Dandelot (2 December 1895 – 17 August 1975) was a French composer and teacher.

== Biography ==
Dandelot was born in Paris. His father was Alfred Dandelot, and his mother was the daughter of a piano maker. Dandelot studied at the Paris Conservatory under Émile Schwartz, Louis Diémer, Xavier Leroux, Jean Gallon, Georges Caussade, Charles-Marie Widor, Vincent d'Indy, Maurice Emmanuel, Paul Dukas, and Albert Roussel. After serving in World War I, he began teaching piano in 1919 at the École Normale de Musique de Paris; from 1942 he taught harmony at the Paris Conservatory, and published treatises on solfege and harmony.

Among his pupils were composers Paul Méfano, Michel Perrault, Rodica Sutzu, and Michel Philippot. See: List of music students by teacher: C to F#Georges Dandelot.

He died in Saint-Georges-de-Didonne, Charente-Maritime.

== Selected compositions ==
=== Orchestral works ===
- Pax, Oratorio for vocal soloists, chorus and orchestra (1937)
- Symphony in D minor (1941)
- Concerto for piano and orchestra (1934)
- Concerto romantique for violon and orchestra (1944)

=== Chamber music ===
- String quartet
- Trois valses, for 2 pianos
- Sonatine, for flute and piano (1938)
- Sonatine, for violin and piano (1946)
- Sonatine, for trumpet (1961)

=== Ballets ===
- Le Souper de famine
- Le Jardin merveilleux
- La Création (1948)

=== Operas ===
- L'Ennemi, opera in 3 acts
- Midas, opéra-comique bouffe in 3 acts (1948)
- Apolline, operetta in 3 acts
