= Ioan Meșotă National College =

Coordinates: 45.654°N 25.609°E

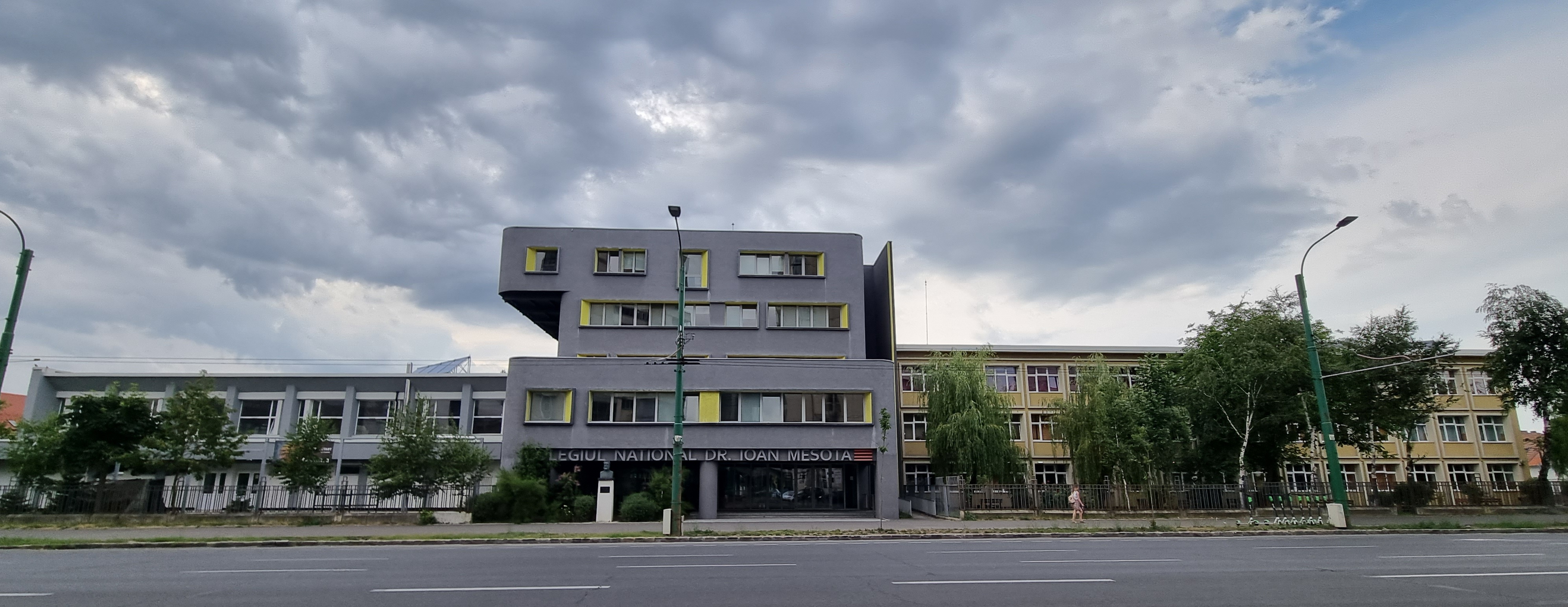
Ioan Meșotă National College

Ioan Meșotă National College (Romanian: Colegiul Național "Dr. Ioan Meșotă") bears a prestigious name in the history of Romanian education, the name of one of the founders of the educational system in Transylvania, doctor in philosophy Ioan Meșotă, a corresponding member of the Romanian Academy. Located at 3 Bihorului Street, in the civic center of Brașov, the college is one of the oldest and most prestigious in the municipality and the county, being founded in 1869. It can be considered one of the first "Realschule" in Transylvania. At the 2024 evaluation of Romanian secondary schools, the college came in 3rd place, with a score of 9.55/10.

== History ==
In the autumn of 1869, the Council of the Romanian Greek-Orthodox Central Schools in Brașov decided to open a "Realschule" and a commercial high school.

George Barițiu was the first one who came up with the idea of opening this school, and in 1854 Ioan Popazu (future bishop of Caransebeș) made the plan for the school.

In 1869, Dr. Ioan Meșotă became the Director of the Romanian Central Schools in Brașov and held this position until his premature death in 1878. It is because of him that the Romanian education in Brașov was firmly positioned on its way to a modern education system. In 1919, following the Union of Transylvania with Romania, the school was merged with the Hungarian High School (founded in 1885, with the building in the city center), and received the name of Ioan Meșotă High School, in his honor.

During over 100 years of activity, the high school has experienced both periods of prosperity and dramatic moments, related to political changes in the Romanian society, followed by often unfounded educational decisions (dissolved by the newly installed communist regime in 1948 and re-profiled as an industrial high school in the eighties). As a result, the school had to be reborn and redefined, trying to regain its status and prestige. The National College of today, initially established as a lower "Realschule" with four grades, was upgraded in 1919 to the higher level of state high school with eight grades; it was re-established, in 1954, as a high school (Brașov High School no. 3).

The current building of the high school (building A) with 19 classrooms, chemistry, physics and foreign language laboratories, teacher's room, work rooms, dentistry and library, dates from 1962. The gym was built between 1971 and 1973.

In April 1971, the school was assigned the name of "Dr. Ioan Meșotă" High School. In 1981, it was transformed into the Industrial High School no. 8, and in 1990 it resumed its name of Dr. Ioan Meșotă Theoretical High School, under which name it remained well established for many years as a symbol of quality and prestige in Romanian education.

In 1999, through the Order of the Minister of National Education Andrei Marga, the Dr. Ioan Meșotă High School was declared a National College.

The construction of a new building began in 2015. Completed in 2017, it came with many modern facilities: 12 new classrooms, a computer lab, a multi-functional room for events, a library, a counseling office, and a medical office.

According to its initial teaching profile of mathematics and physics, with special classes of mathematics in the 1970s, in 1990 the high school was redefined as a high school of mathematics-physics, dedicated to the preparation of highly competitive and ambitious students, with talent and aspirations for professions focused on technical, economic, financial, as well as medical or military sciences.

The current science profile of the high school with emphasis on mathematical and computer preparation does not exclude the orientation towards a creative or didactic-educational profile for the students interested in humanistic preparation, of course.

== Alumni ==
- Marcian Bleahu
- Vasile Geonea
- Constantin Herold
- Darie Magheru
- Constantin Țoiu

== Bibliography ==
- (in Romanian) Bodea, Valentin; Colegiul Național "Dr. Ioan Meșotă" 1869–2009 Momente – etape – profesori – promoții; Editura Romprint, Brașov 2009

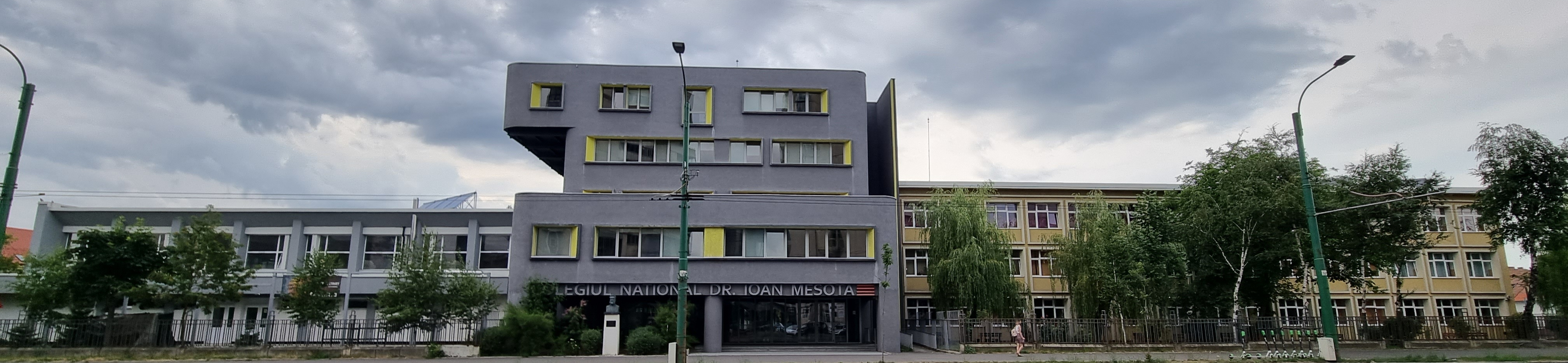
"Dr Ioan Meșotă" National College, Brașov
