= Horia, Neamț =

Horia
- Commune
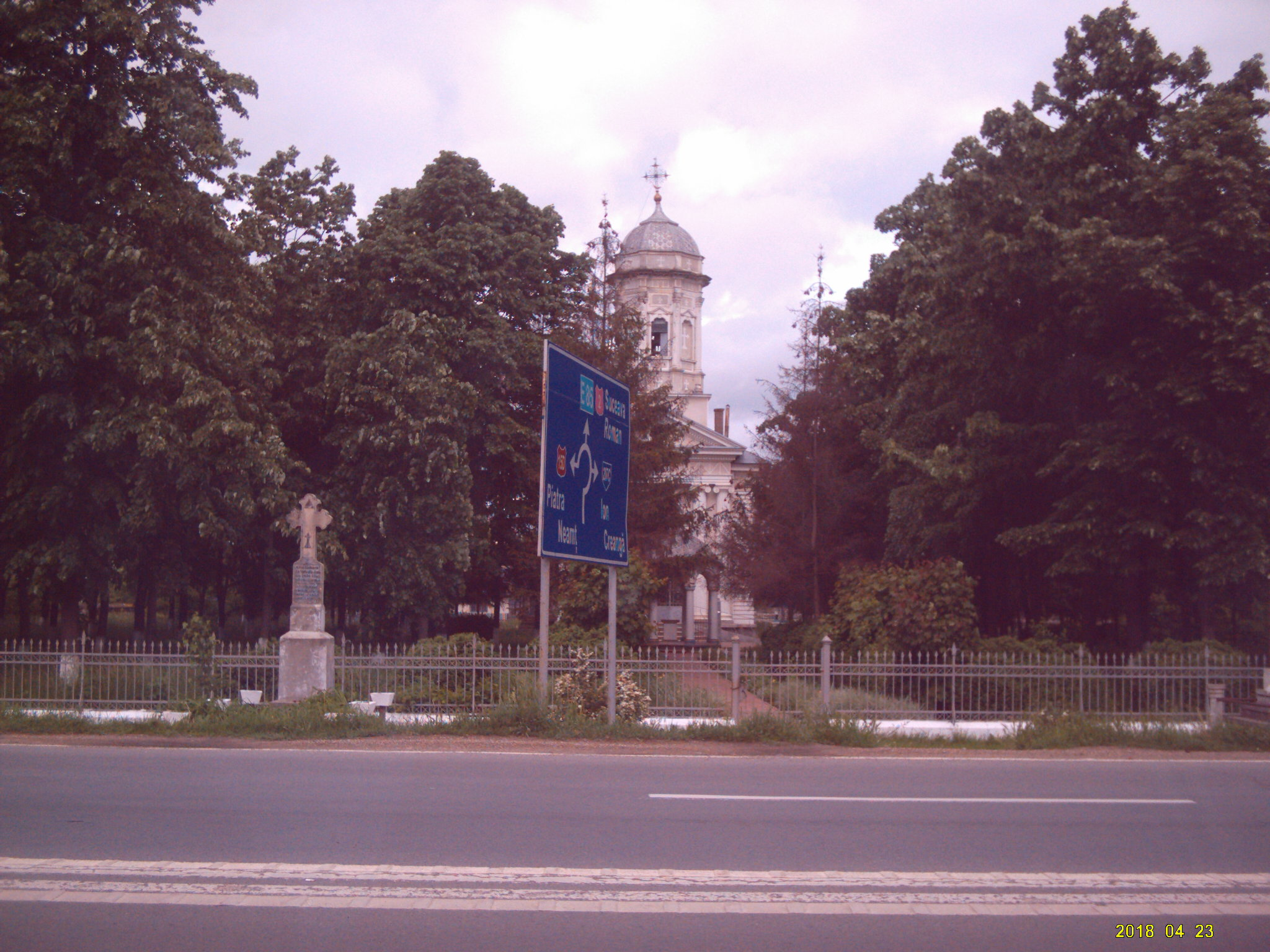
- Church in the center of the commune

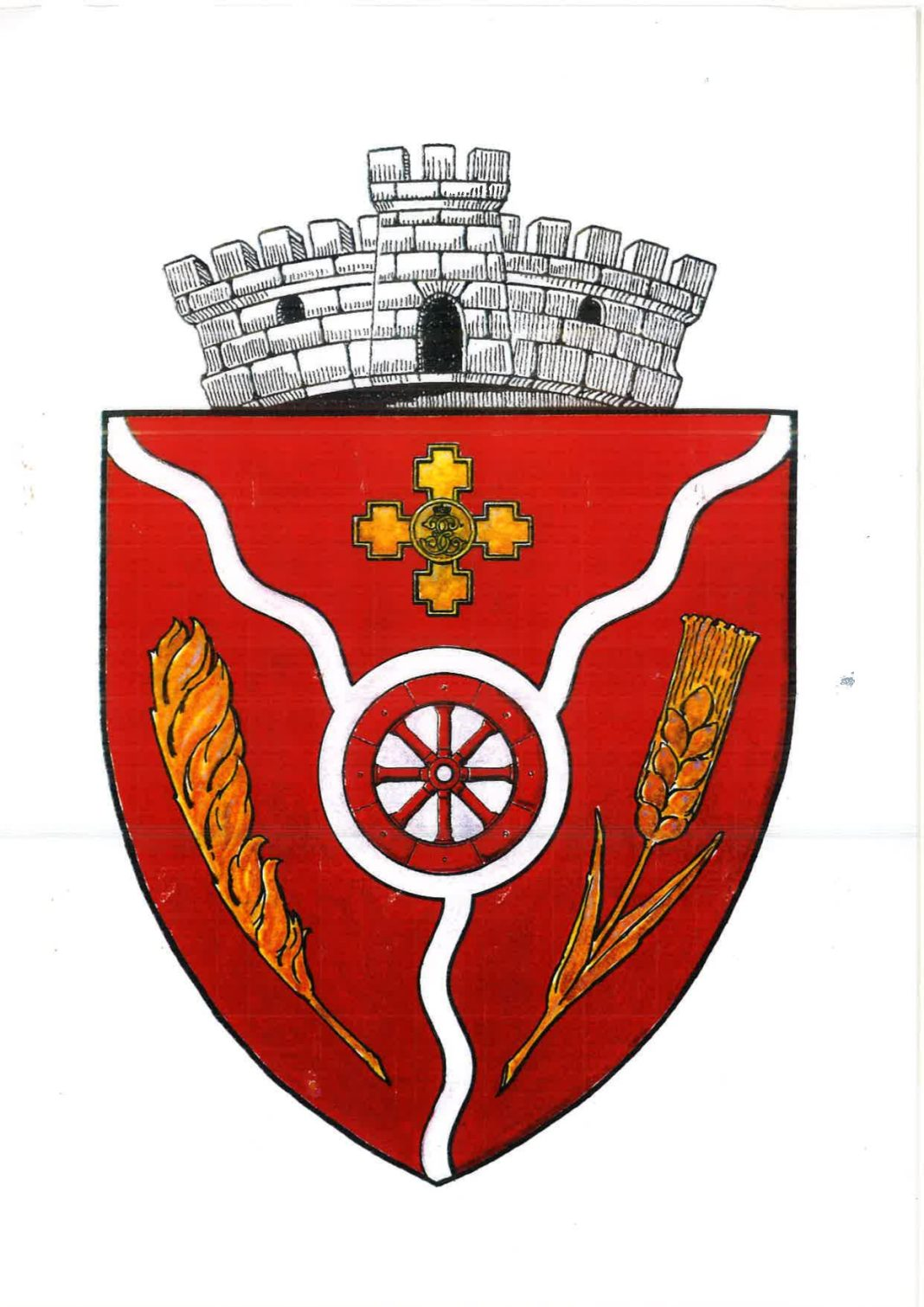
- Coat of arms

- Location in Neamț County

- Location in Romania
- Coordinates: 46.911°N 26.917°E
- Country: Romania
- County: Neamț

Government
  - Mayor (2020–2024): Ioan-Cristian Baciu (PNL)
- Area: 40.29 km^{2} (15.56 sq mi)
- Elevation: 184 m (604 ft)
- Population (2021-12-01): 5,750
  - Density: 143/km^{2} (370/sq mi)
- Time zone: UTC+02:00 (EET)
  - Summer (DST): UTC+03:00 (EEST)
- Postal code: 617245
- Area code: +(40) 233
- Vehicle reg.: NT
- Website: primariahorianeamt.ro

Horia is a commune in Neamț County, Western Moldavia, Romania. It is composed of two villages, Cotu Vameș and Horia.

The commune is located in the eastern part of the county, about 2.5 km (1.6 mi) south-southwest of the center of Roman.

Historical population
Year	Pop.	±%
1992	7,219	—
2002	7,104	−1.6%
2011	5,826	−18.0%
2021	5,750	−1.3%
Source: Census data

== Natives ==
- Otilia Cazimir (1894–1967), poet
- Radu Timofte (1949–2009), head of the Romanian Intelligence Service from 2001 to 2006
