= Mihai Damian =

Romanian ski jumper

Personal information
- Nationality: Romanian
- Born: 2 February 1990 (age 36) Brașov, Romania

Sport
- Sport: Skiing
- Club: CS Dinamo Brașov

World Cup career
- Seasons: 2004–2008

Mihai Damian (born 2 February 1990) is a Romanian retired ski jumper who represented Romania from 2004 to 2008. He competed in the FIS Nordic World Ski Championships 2007, participated three times in the FIS Nordic Junior World Ski Championships, and won three gold medals at the 2007 Romanian National Championships, as well as gold and silver medals in 2008.

In the 2007–08 season, Damian earned points in the FIS Cup four times, with his best result being 24th place in Notodden. He competed 17 times in the winter FIS Ski Jumping Continental Cup and four times in the Summer Continental Cup, but never scored points. His highest Continental Cup finish was 51st in Braunlage during the 2004–05 season. He never participated in the FIS Ski Jumping World Cup.

In 2007, Damian competed in the qualifications for both individual events at the Nordic World Ski Championships but failed to advance to the main competitions, finishing last in both qualifiers.

== Personal life ==
Mihai Damian was born on 2 February 1990 in Brașov, Romania. He is fluent in Romanian and English. His first ski jump was at age seven in 1997. He joined the Romanian national ski jumping team in 2004.

== Career ==
=== Pre-2004–05 season ===
In August 2002, Damian competed in the unofficial Children's World Championships for under-13s in Garmisch-Partenkirchen, finishing 12th, ahead only of disqualified Estonian Sander Reitula. In July 2004, he debuted in the Summer Continental Cup in Velenje, placing 57th and outperforming Péter Tuczai and Dénes Pungor. The next day, he finished 68th, surpassing only Pungor. In Ramsau that summer, he placed 87th and 91st, beating Volodymyr Boshchuk and Pungor in the first event but finishing last in the second. In August 2004, he competed in the unofficial Children's World Championships for under-15s in Garmisch-Partenkirchen, placing 13th out of 14.

In December 2004, Damian debuted in the winter FIS Ski Jumping Continental Cup in Harrachov but was disqualified. In Switzerland, he competed in Sankt Moritz and Engelberg, finishing 77th and 85th, respectively, outperforming Li Chengbo, Ihor Boichuk, and Illimar Pärn in Sankt Moritz but finishing last in Engelberg.

In 2004, he won a bronze medal at the Romanian National Championships.

=== 2005–06 season ===
In the 2005 summer season, Damian competed in the first four FIS Cup events. In Predazzo, he placed 78th and 73rd, surpassing Flavio Fruch, Roman Kuriawski, and Ciprian Ioniță in the first event, and Johnathan Sevick, Diego Dellasega, Kuriawski, and Fruch in the second. In Bischofshofen, he finished 48th in the first event, beating 11 competitors, but was disqualified in the second.

In 2005, he earned another bronze medal at the Romanian National Championships.

In February 2006, Damian competed in the 2006 Junior World Ski Championships in Kranj but was disqualified.

=== 2006–07 season ===
In the 2006–07 season, Damian competed in seven FIS Cup events. In Bischofshofen, he was disqualified in the first event but placed 34th in the second, outperforming Aleksandr Voronkov, Markus Eisenbichler, Klemens Murańka, and Stanislav Oshchepkov. In Garmisch-Partenkirchen, he finished 39th, beating eight competitors. In Einsiedeln, he placed 31st and 42nd, missing the final round and points in the first event by 0.5 points and beating only Niklas Strandbråten in the second. In Zakopane's winter FIS Cup, he finished 55th (tied with Andrei Balazs and Mojmír Nosáľ, beating 15 competitors) and 62nd, surpassing nine athletes.

In July 2006, he competed in the unofficial Children's World Championships for under-17s in Garmisch-Partenkirchen, placing 9th out of 11, ahead of Mojmír Nosáľ and Domingo Boland.

In 2006, Damian won his third bronze medal at the Romanian National Championships and two junior national titles, earning him the title of best athlete at CS Dinamo Brașov for 2006.

In March 2007, he competed in the 2007 Nordic World Ski Championships in Sapporo, finishing last in the qualifiers for both the normal and large hill events. That same month, at the 2007 Junior World Ski Championships in Planica, he placed 67th out of 75 competitors, including two disqualified athletes.

=== 2007–08 season ===
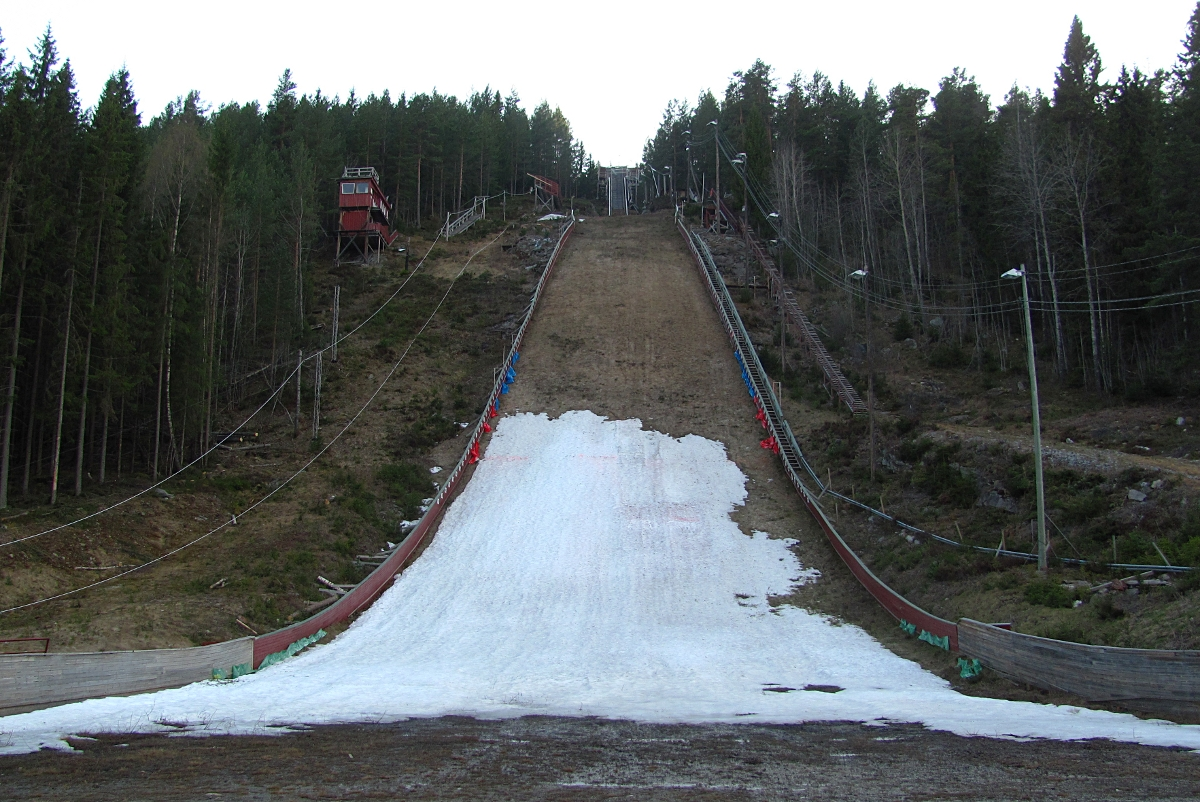
Tveitanbakken, where Mihai Damian earned his first FIS Cup points

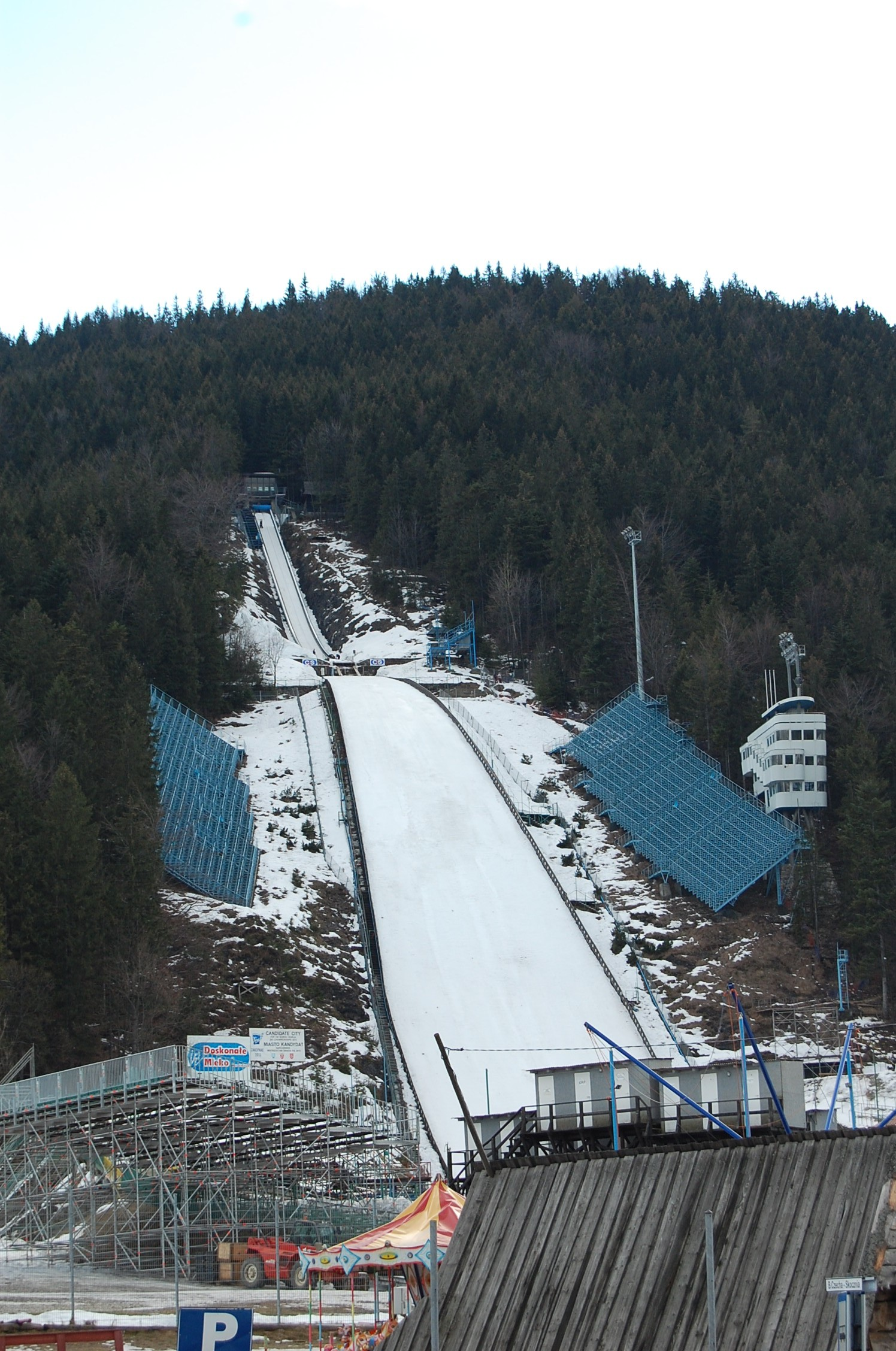
Wielka Krokiew, where Mihai Damian jumped 100 m in 2008

In the 2007–08 season, Damian competed in 12 FIS Cup events and four Continental Cup events. He scored FIS Cup points four times: 27th and 24th at Tveitanbakken in Notodden Municipality, and 27th and 29th at the Erzberg Arena in Eisenerz. These results earned him 17 points and 206th place in the FIS Cup general classification. In Notodden, the first event saw him finish last (27th) after a disqualification in the second round, while in the second, he outperformed Jeremy Baig, Szilveszter Kozma, Remus Tudor, and Jan Fuhre. In Eisenerz, he tied with Jaka Oblak to beat 11 competitors in the first event and surpassed nine in the second.

In the 2007–08 Continental Cup, Damian did not score points. He competed in Zakopane and Hinterzarten, placing 76th (out of 83, including two disqualified) and 80th in Zakopane, where he jumped 100 m at Wielka Krokiew on 3 February 2008, beating Bogomil Pavlov, Volodymyr Veredyuk, and Remus Tudor in the latter. In Hinterzarten, he finished 59th and 60th, beating Thomas de Wit, Kozma, Pavlov, and Tudor in both events.

Damian also competed in two FIS Ski Jumping Alpen Cup events at Toni-Seelos-Olympiaschanze in Seefeld, finishing 65th (out of 70) and 61st (out of 69).

In December 2007, he won three gold medals at the Romanian National Championships and two junior titles, earning him the second-best athlete award at CS Dinamo Brașov, behind gymnast Lucian Frățiloiu. He also placed 9th in the Romanian Ski and Biathlon Federation's poll for the best skier of 2007.

Due to insufficient snow in Romania, the February 2008 national championships were held in Zakopane. Damian won a silver medal in the individual senior event on Średnia Krokiew, finishing behind Andrei Balazs. With Balazs and Szilveszter Kozma, he won the team event for CS Dinamo Brașov. In the junior category, he earned a bronze medal, behind Kozma and Remus Tudor.

In late February, Damian competed in his third Junior World Ski Championships in Zakopane, finishing 49th.

=== 2008 summer season ===
Damian's final FIS-sanctioned competitions were in August 2008 at the FIS Cup in Štrbské Pleso, where he placed 51st and 49th. He was listed for FIS Cup events in Oberwiesenthal and the Continental Cup in Villach but did not compete.

== Achievements ==
=== Nordic World Ski Championships ===
Place	Date	Location	Hill	HS	Event	Jump 1	Jump 2	Points	Deficit	Winner
nq	23 February 2007	(Japan) Sapporo	Okurayama Ski Jump Stadium	HS 134	Individual	77.5	–	23.0	–	–
nq	2 March 2007	(Japan) Sapporo	Miyanomori Ski Jump Stadium	HS 100	Individual	72.5	–	71.5	–	–

=== Junior World Ski Championships ===
Place	Date	Location	Hill	HS	Event	Jump 1	Jump 2	Points	Deficit	Winner
DSQ	2 February 2006	(Slovenia) Kranj	Bauhenk	HS 109	Individual	DSQ	–	DSQ	–	Gregor Schlierenzauer
67	15 March 2007	(Slovenia) Planica	Bloudkova velikanka	HS 100	Individual	62.5	–	51.0	217.0	Roman Koudelka
49	27 February 2008	(Poland) Zakopane	Średnia Krokiew	HS 94	Individual	75.0	–	88.5	163.0	Andreas Wank

=== Continental Cup ===
==== Results in individual Continental Cup events ====
2004–05 season
Rovaniemi	Rovaniemi	Lahti	Lahti	Harrachov	Harrachov	Sankt Moritz	Engelberg	Engelberg	Seefeld	Planica	Planica	Sapporo	Sapporo	Sapporo	Bischofshofen	Bischofshofen	Lauscha	Lauscha	Braunlage	Braunlage	Brotterode	Brotterode	Westby	Westby	Iron Mountain	Iron Mountain	Vikersund	Vikersund	Zakopane	Points
–	–	–	–	dq	–	78	77	–	85	74	75	–	–	–	–	–	60	63	51	54	73	69	–	–	–	–	–	–	71	0
2007–08 season
Pragelato	Pragelato	Rovaniemi	Rovaniemi	Rovaniemi	Garmisch-Partenkirchen	Garmisch-Partenkirchen	Engelberg	Engelberg	Kranj	Kranj	Sapporo	Sapporo	Sapporo	Brotterode	Zakopane	Zakopane	Hinterzarten	Hinterzarten	Iron Mountain	Ramsau	Ramsau	Whistler	Whistler	Trondheim	Trondheim	Vikersund	Vikersund	Points		
–	–	–	–	–	–	–	–	–	–	–	–	–	–	–	76	80	59	60	–	–	–	–	–	–	–	–	–	0		
Legend
1 2 3 4-10 11-30 Below 30 dq – Disqualified - – Did not compete

=== Summer Continental Cup ===
==== Results in individual Summer Continental Cup events ====
2004
Velenje	Velenje	Oberstdorf	Oberstdorf	Ramsau	Ramsau	Lillehammer	Lillehammer	Points
57	68	–	–	87	91	–	–	0
Legend
1 2 3 4-10 11-30 Below 30 dq – Disqualified: – Did not compete

=== FIS Cup ===
==== Overall standings ====
Season	Place
2007–08	206

==== Results in individual FIS Cup events ====
2005–06 season
Predazzo	Predazzo	Bischofshofen	Bischofshofen	Sankt Moritz	Sankt Moritz	Vikersund	Vikersund	Kuopio	Kuopio	Seefeld	Harrachov	Harrachov	Ljubno	Ljubno	Courchevel	Courchevel	Zaō	Zaō	Sapporo	Zakopane	Points				
78	73	48	dq	–	–	–	–	–	–	–	–	–	–	–	–	–	–	–	–	–	0				
2006–07 season
Bischofshofen	Bischofshofen	Garmisch-Partenkirchen	Örnsköldsvik	Örnsköldsvik	Einsiedeln	Einsiedeln	Seefeld	Chaux-Neuve	Chaux-Neuve	Zakopane	Zakopane	Zaō	Zaō	Sapporo	Points										
dq	34	39	–	–	31	42	–	–	–	55	62	–	–	–	0										
2007–08 season
Bischofshofen	Bischofshofen	Oberwiesenthal	Oberwiesenthal	Falun	Falun	Einsiedeln	Einsiedeln	Notodden	Notodden	Harrachov	Harrachov	Lauscha	Lauscha	Eisenerz	Eisenerz	Kuopio	Kuopio	Szczyrk	Szczyrk	Whistler	Whistler	Sapporo	Zaō	Zaō	Points
52	47	–	–	–	–	43	48	27	24	49	60	39	38	27	29	–	–	–	–	–	–	–	–	–	17
2008–09 season
Oberwiesenthal	Oberwiesenthal	Štrbské Pleso	Štrbské Pleso	Predazzo	Predazzo	Einsiedeln	Einsiedeln	Štrbské Pleso	Harrachov	Harrachov	Yabuli	Lauscha	Eisenerz	Eisenerz	Notodden	Notodden	Ljubno	Ljubno	Zaō	Zaō	Sapporo	Points			
–	–	51	49	–	–	–	–	–	–	–	–	–	–	–	–	–	–	–	–	–	–	0			
Legend
1 2 3 4-10 11-30 Below 30 dq – Disqualified - – Did not compete
