= Ioan Meșotă =

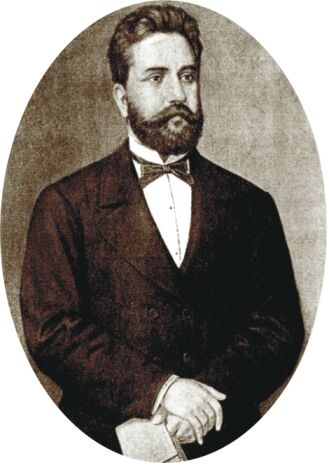
Ioan Meșotă

Ioan G. Meșotă (June 24, 1837 – January 31 [O.S. January 19] 1878) was an Austro-Hungarian ethnic Romanian educator.

Born into a peasant family in Dârste, a neighborhood of Brașov city in the Transylvania region, he was sent to the little local school at the age of six, attending for two years. He then completed the church school in Turcheș. In 1849, as a result of the ongoing revolution, the Meșotă family sought refuge in Wallachia and was housed at a small monastery in Bobolia village. They returned home in 1850. He subsequently entered the Hungarian Roman Catholic gymnasium in Brașov, where Iacob Mureșianu was on the faculty. In 1851, upon the advice of the city's Romanian Orthodox archpriest, Ioan Popasu, he entered the new Romanian Gymnasium, where he was classmates with Titu Maiorescu. He graduated from the Honterus upper gymnasium, taking his leaving examination in 1858. He studied philosophy for two years at the University of Vienna before moving on to the University of Bonn, which awarded him a doctorate in philosophy.

Meșotă returned home in 1861, the year he was hired to teach at Brașov's Romanian gymnasium, where he offered courses on classical languages and history. In the autumn of 1869, two new affiliated three-year schools opened alongside the gymnasium: one Realschule and one commercial. Meșotă, deputy director from that point, became principal of all three institutions in 1870. Meanwhile, he was assessor for the Sibiu Archdiocese's consistory and a member of the Brașov school committee. In September 1877, upon the proposal of Maiorescu and of its president Ion Ghica, he was elected a corresponding member of the Romanian Academy. In 1919, following the union of Transylvania with Romania, the schools he helped found were consolidated as the Ioan Meșotă High School. Meșotă's interests included ancient history, epigraphy and geography. The author of school textbooks, he was an active participant in his city's cultural life.

== Bibliography ==
- (in Romanian) Bodea, Valentin & Răducanu, Viorel - Dr. Ioan Meșotă (1837-1878) preliminarii biografice, Editura Orator, Brașov 2003
