= Valentin Greissing =

Valentin Greissing (also Valentin von Greißing, Valentinus Greisingius; 1635–17 September 1701) was a Lutheran theologian, philologist, and educator.

He was born and died in Kronstadt. He studied at the University of Wittenberg, and later taught at the gymnasium in Stettin. In 1684 he was named rector at the gymnasium in Kronstadt, and in 1694 he was elected pastor at the Marktes in Rosenau.

== Published works ==
- Exercitatio academica prior de Atheismo opposita inprimis Renato des Cartes et Matthiae Knutzen.
- Exercitatio academica posterior de Atheismo. Wittenberg 1677.
- Disputationes exegetico-polemicae in compendium librorum theologicorum Leonardi Hutteri. Coronae 1693 typis L. Seuleri.
- Compendium metaphysicum.
- Compendium Grammaticae Ebreae ex mente praecipuorum philologorum.
- Donatus latino germanicus tyronum caputi accomodatus oder Kinder-Donat.
