= Mișu Popp =

Romanian artist

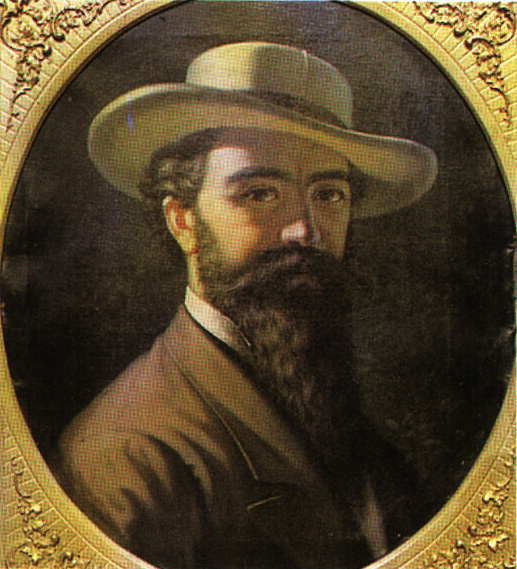
- Mișu Popp – Self Portrait
- Born: March 19, 1827; Brassó, Principality of Transylvania, Kingdom of Hungary, Austrian Empire
- Died: March 6, 1892 (aged 64); Brassó, Austria-Hungary
- Known for: painting, mural
- Movement: Academism

Signature
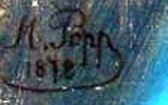

Mișu Popp (March 19, 1827 – March 6, 1892) was a Romanian painter and muralist.

== Biography ==
Born in Brassó, Kingdom of Hungary (now Brașov, Romania), he was the eighth child of Ioan Popp Moldovan de Galați (1774–1869) and Elena (1783–1867), born Ivan, a family from the Fogaras region. His father was a church muralist, painter, and sculptor.

Popp finished his art studies in 1848, at the Academy of Fine Arts from Vienna, where he developed a serious academic style.

He carried on the work of his father by painting several churches from Bucharest, Brașov (Tocile, Saint Nicholas Church), Araci, Râșnov, Satulung, Târgu-Jiu, Câmpulung, Urlați, etc. Between 1847 and 1853, he painted with Constantin Lecca the church of Curtea Veche from Bucharest.

But his main art legacy resides in creating many portraits of the personalities of his time (Ion Heliade Rădulescu, Andrei Mureșanu, Vasile Alecsandri, Alexandru Ioan Cuza etc.) and of some famous historical figures, such as Michael the Brave, inspired from a contemporary engraving of the voivode.

His paintings are displayed in Bucharest at the Romanian Literature Museum and the National Art Museum, as well as in museums in Arad, Brașov, Ploiești, and Sibiu. A street in Râșnov bears his name. He is buried in Brașov's Groaveri cemetery.

== Gallery ==
Click on an image to view it enlarged.

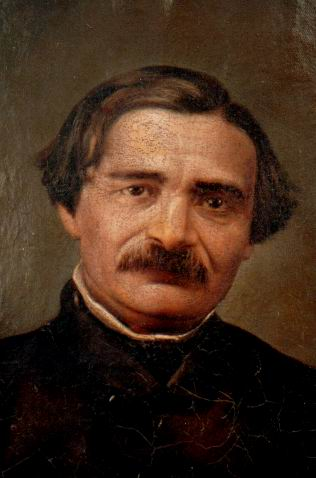
Portrait of Ion Heliade Rădulescu

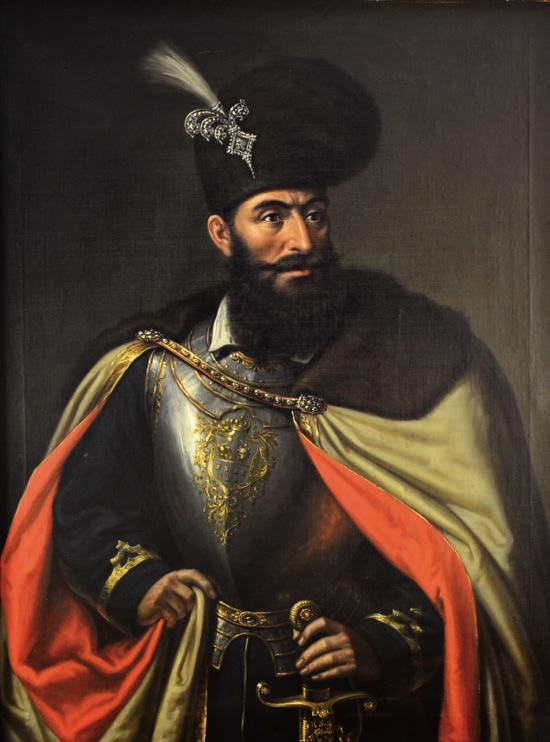
Portrait of Michael the Brave

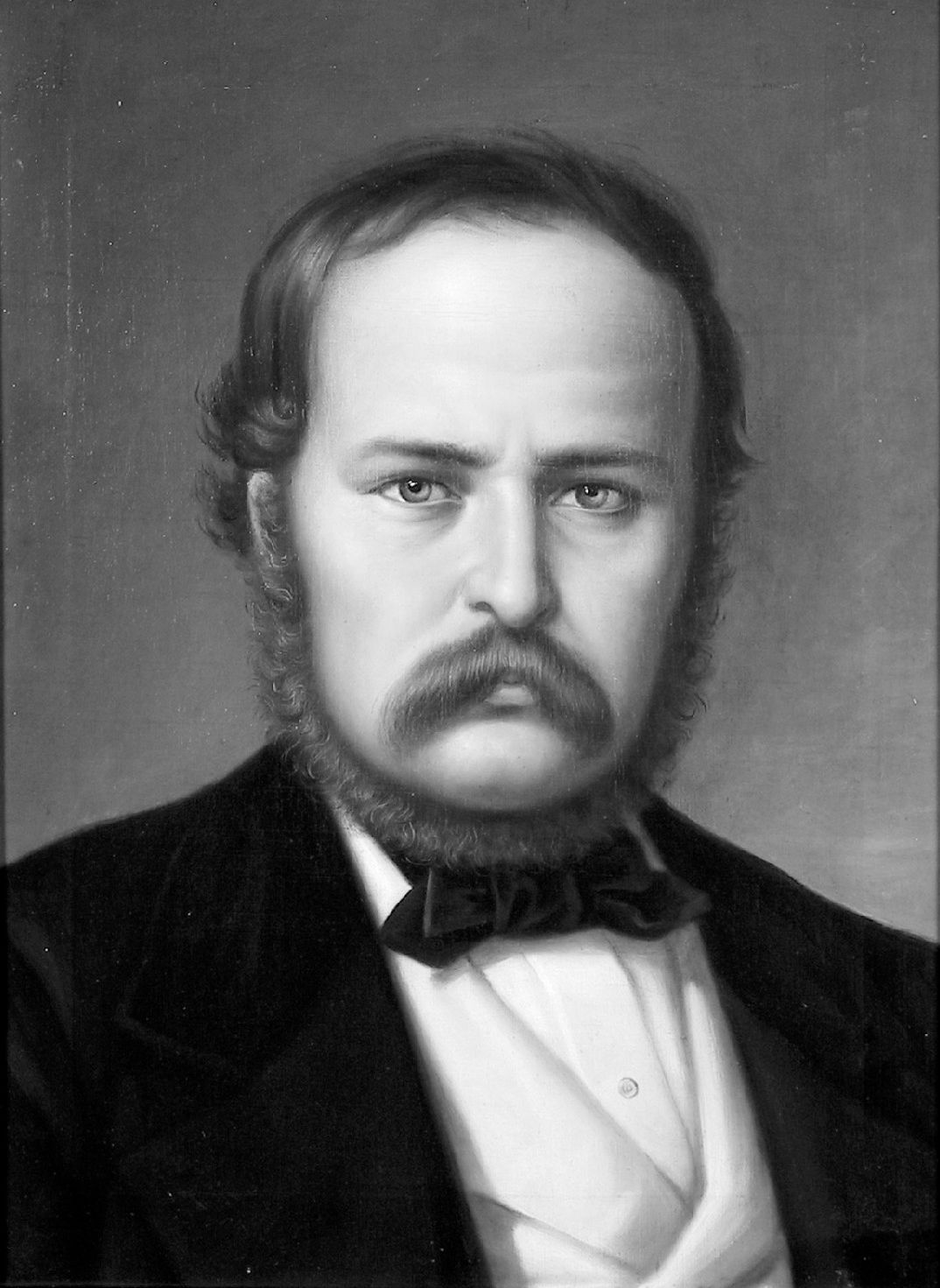
Portrait of Andrei Mureșanu

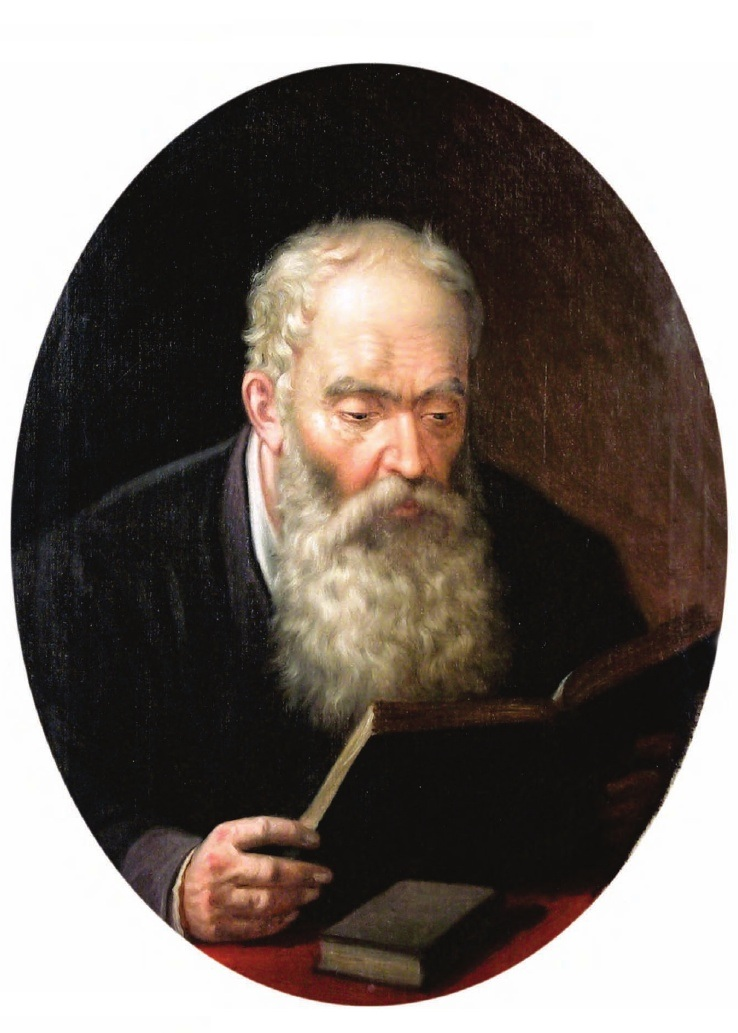
Portrait of the painter's father

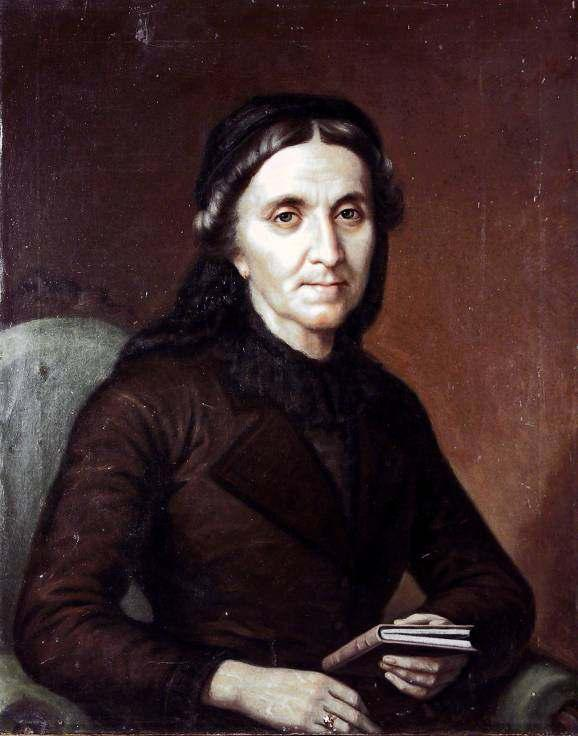
Portrait of Sevastia Panovici

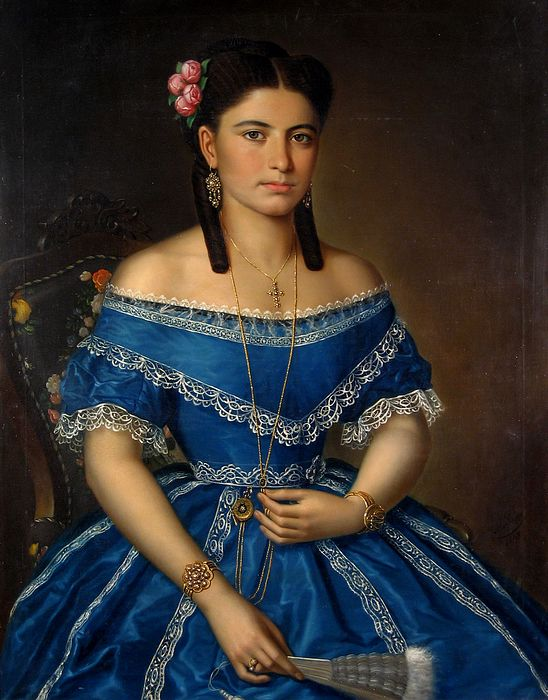
Lady in blue

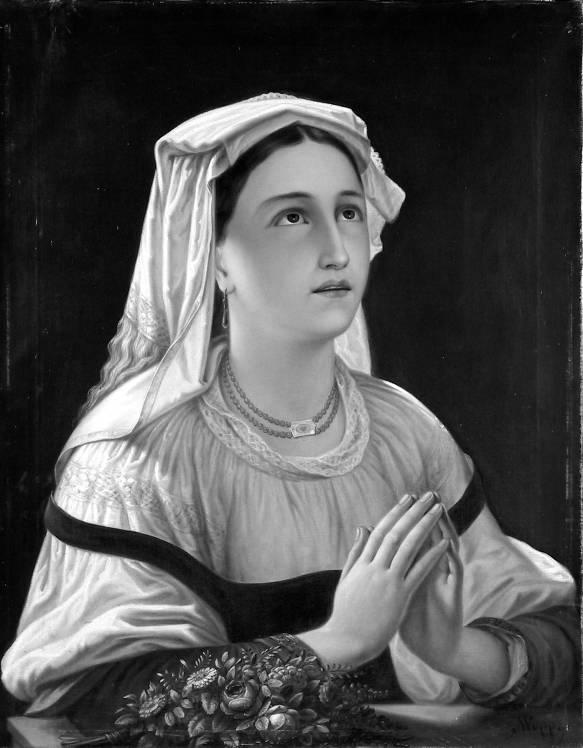
Italian peasant woman praying

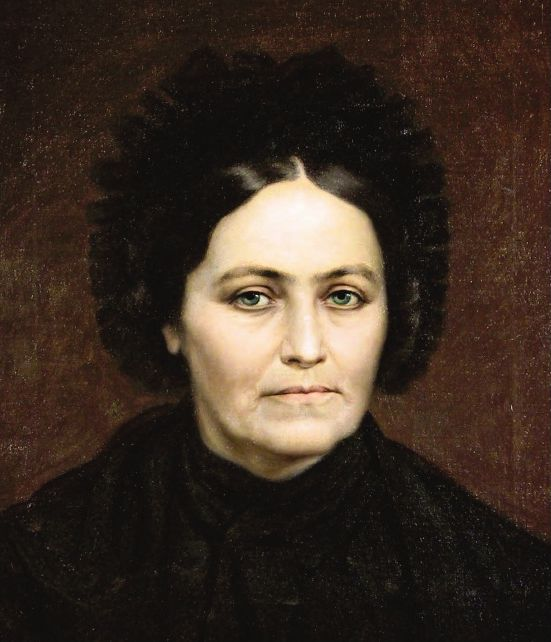
Portrait of the painter's mother
