= Darie Magheru =

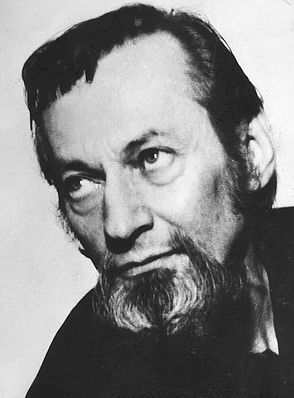
- Born: Aurel Zaharia Moldova; October 25, 1923; Lunca Câlnicului, Brașov County, Kingdom of Romania
- Died: October 25, 1983 (aged 60)
- Other name: Aurel Zaharia Moldoveanu
- Occupations: Poet, theatre actor

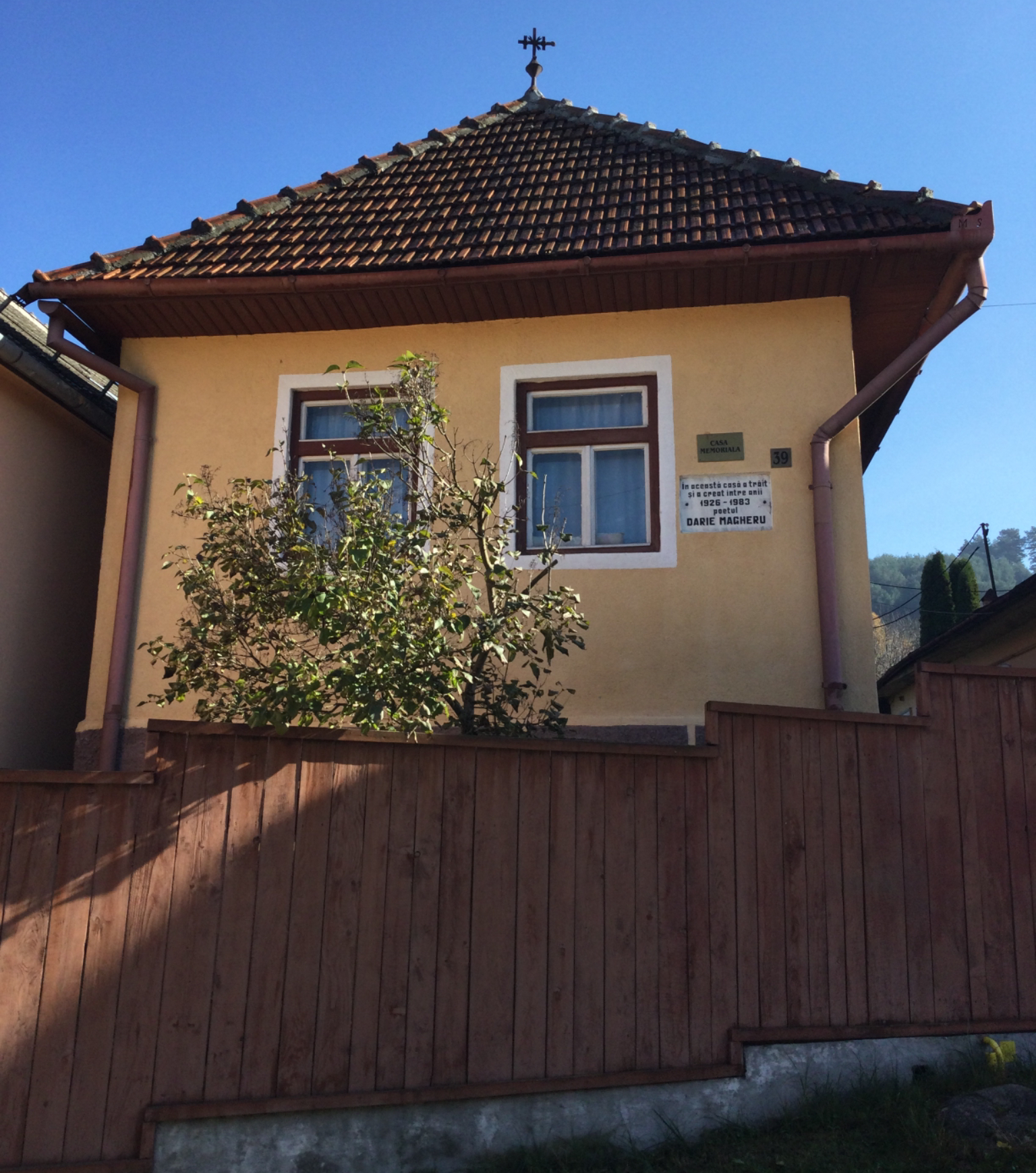
Magheru memorial house in Turcheș, today part of Săcele

Darie Magheru (pen name of Aurel Zaharia Moldovan or Moldoveanu; October 25, 1923–October 25, 1983) was a Romanian poet and theatre actor.

Born in Lunca Câlnicului, Brașov County, his parents were the clerk Simion Moldovan and his wife Valeria (née Nicolescu). From 1930 to 1934, he attended primary school in Turcheș, followed by Ioan Meșotă High School in Brașov, graduating in 1943. In 1950, early in the communist period, he completed studies at the Iași Dramatic Conservatory. He was then arrested in connection with alleged membership in Sumanele Negre, part of the Romanian anti-communist resistance movement, spending a year and a half in prison.

Between 1951 and 1956, Moldovan was an actor at the State Theatre in Stalin City (as Brașov was temporarily called), as well as in Ploiești and Arad. From 1956 to 1958, he was arts inspector for the Stalin Region government. From 1958 to 1960, he returned to acting at the local theatre. In 1960–1961, he was an inspector in the film industry. In 1962–1964, Moldovan acted at the State Theatre in Botoșani. He taught at the Brașov People's Art School from 1964 until 1966, when illness forced his retirement. He died in suspicious conditions in Brașov. Darie Horațiu Moldovan, his son from his first marriage and a supporter of the Charter 77 movement, died in exile at age 41, in unexplained circumstances.

Magheru's literary debut came in 1941 with the short volume of poetry Cu barda-n porți de veac, which he considered insignificant; no copies survive. He contributed to Astra and to România Literară. He wrote for and jointly edited Caiete de literatură, which appeared at Brașov in 1968. Written between 1950 and 1957, the dramatic poem Eu, meșterul Manole was initially published in 1957, reappearing in the 1968 volume Poeme. His play Tragicul domn Ion al Cămilelor was performed at the Brașov Dramatic Theatre in 1978–1979. His later poetry volumes are Caprichos (1970), Schițe iconografice (1973), Guernica (1974) and Zeu orb cu flori (1982). In these, Magheru's interest in modernizing the medium becomes more pronounced; his outlook evolves into a mix of erudition and aesthetic nonconformism. Some of his best work was left unpublished, in manuscript form. Beginning in 2013, Editura Eikon published his writings in three volumes: poems, prose and plays.

A street in Săcele bears his name; the poet’s sister set up a memorial house there.

== Bibliography ==
- Cu barda-n porți de veac. 1941.
- Eu, meșterul Manole. Bucharest: Editura de Stat pentru Literatură și Artă. 1957. OCLC 36018928.
- Poeme. Bucharest: Editura pentru Literatură. 1968. OCLC 562599839.
- Caprichos. Bucharest: Editura Albatros. 1970. OCLC 432567874.
- Schițe iconografice. Bucharest: Cartea Românească. 1973. OCLC 84093282.
- Guernica. Bucharest: Editura Albatros. 1974. OCLC 4832857.
- Zeu orb cu flori. Bucharest: Cartea Românească. 1982. OCLC 895208739.
- Exclusiv tauri. Brașov: Editura Arania. 1991. ISBN 9739513808. OCLC 895041818.
- Nemuritorul în solitudine și durerea. Brașov: Editura Arania. 1995.
- Pygmalion și alte poeme. Brașov: Editura Arania. 1996.
- Forum Traiani. Brașov: Editura Arania. 1998.
- Cărămida cu mâner. Brașov: Editura Arania. 2005.
- Scrieri – Volumul I, poeme. Cluj-Napoca: Editura Eikon. 2013.
- Scrieri – Volumul II, proză. Cluj-Napoca: Editura Eikon. 2014.
- Scrieri – Volumul III, teatru. Bucharest: Editura Eikon. 2015.
