= Tudor Ciortea =

Romanian musician

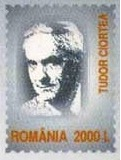
- Ciortea on a Romanian stamp from 2003
- Born: November 28, 1903; Brassó, Austria-Hungary
- Died: October 13, 1982 (aged 78); Cluj-Napoca, Romania
- Resting place: Tocile Church cemetery, Brașov, Romania
- Education: Bucharest Conservatory
- Occupations: Composer, Musicologist, Music Educator
- Notable work: Din isprăvile lui Păcală (Some of Păcală's Exploits)

Tudor Ciortea (28 November 1903 – 13 October 1982) was a Romanian composer, musicologist, and music educator.

== Life and career ==
Ciortea was born in Brașov and began his music studies under Gheorghe Dima in Cluj. He went on to study at the Bucharest Conservatory (now the National University of Music) under Ion Nonna Otescu and in Paris under Nadia Boulanger and Paul Dukas. He lived most of his life in Bucharest where he taught for over thirty years at the Bucharest Conservatory. Amongst his students there were the composers Liana Alexandra, Irina Odagescu, Elise Popovici, Maya Badian, and Carmen Petra Basacopol.

His compositions concentrated on chamber music and art song and were influenced by the French chamber music tradition and the traditional folksongs of Transylvania. According to Nicolas Slonimsky, Ciortea's best chamber music was remarkable for its "contrapuntal complexity." In 1964, Ciortea won the "George Enescu Prize" of the Romanian Academy for his octet Din isprăvile lui Păcală (Some of Păcală's Exploits). He was awarded in 1971 the Order of the Star of the Romanian Socialist Republic, 3rd class,

He is buried in the graveyard next to the Tocile Church in Șcheii Brașovului. The Tudor Ciortea Memorial House in Brașov contains some of his personal effects and instruments as well as a portrait of his wife, the dancer and choreographer Vera Proca Ciortea. The music school, Liceul de Muzică "Tudor Ciortea", in Brașov is named in his honour, as is the city's annual chamber music festival. A street in Cluj-Napoca also bears his name.
