= Andreea Adespii =

Romanian handball player (born 1990)

Personal information
- Full name: Andreea Adespii
- Nationality: Romanian
- Born: 9 May 1990 (age 36) Brașov, Romania
- Height: 1.79 m (5 ft 10 in)

Sport
- Sport: Handball
- Position: Left Back
- Current club: SCM Craiova

Youth career
- Years: Team
- –: CNOE Râmnicu Vâlcea

Senior clubs
- Years: Team
- 2009–2014: Dunărea Brăila
- 2014–2020: SCM Râmnicu Vâlcea
- 2020–: SCM Craiova
National team
- Years: Team
- 2018–: Romania

Andreea Adespii (née Molnar; born 9 May 1990) is a Romanian female handball player who plays for SCM Craiova.

== Achievements ==
- Liga Națională:
  - Winner: 2019
  - Bronze Medalist: 2014
- Cupa României:
  - Finalist: 2018, 2019
- Supercupa României:
  - Winner: 2018
