= Andrei Mureșanu =

Romanian poet and revolutionary

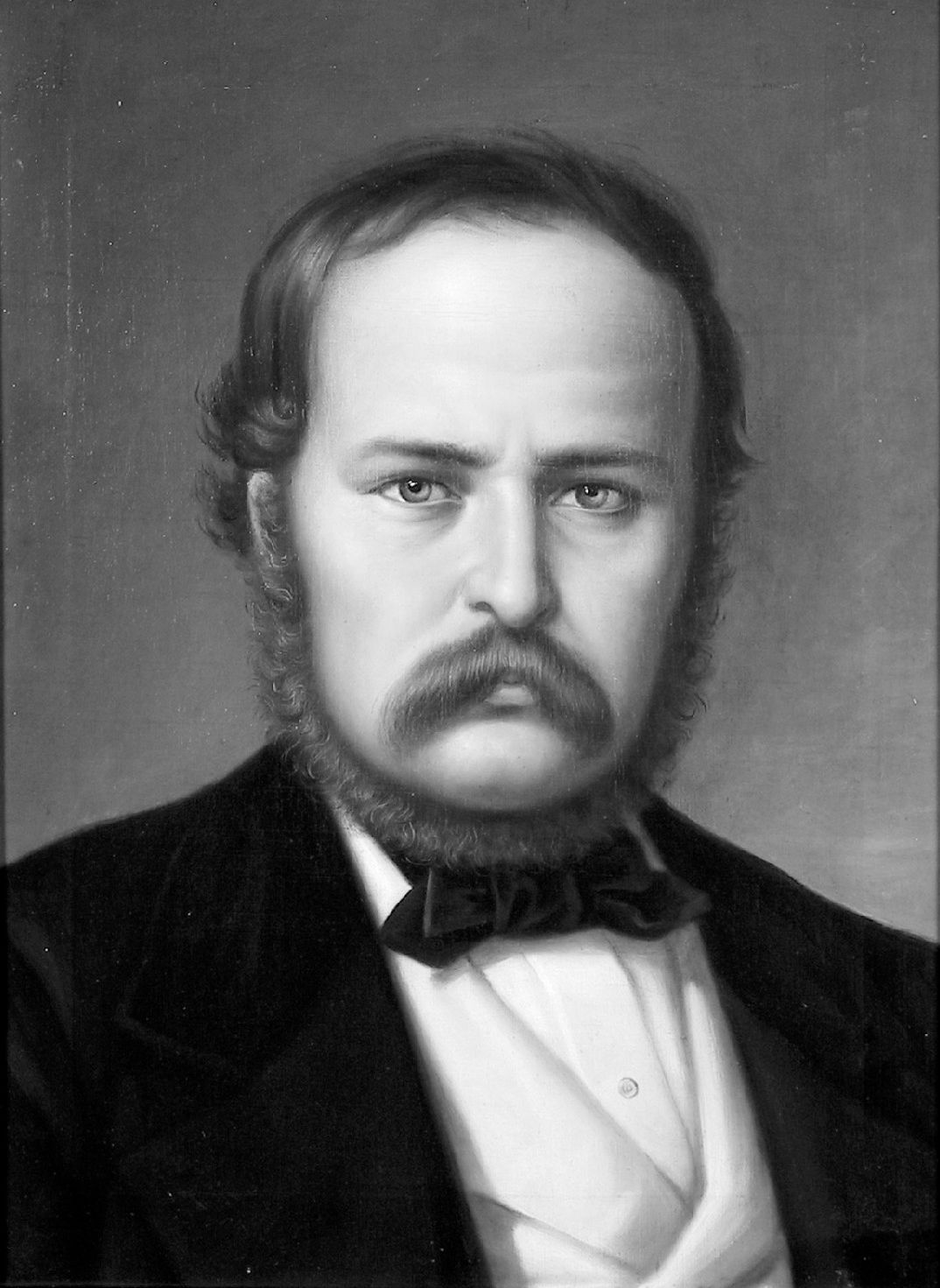
Andrei Mureșianu (portrait by Mișu Popp)

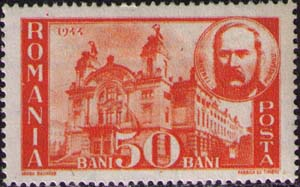
1945 stamp

Andrei Mureșanu (Romanian pronunciation: [anˈdrej mureˈʃanu]; November 16, 1816 in Bistrița – October 12, 1863 in Brașov) was a Romanian poet and revolutionary of Transylvania.

Born in a family of a small business owner in the countryside, he studied philosophy and theology in Blaj. In 1838 he started working as a professor in Brașov. He published his first poetry in the magazine Foaie pentru minte, inimă și literatură (Paper for mind, heart and literature). He was one of the leading figures of the 1848 revolution in Transylvania, taking part in the Brașov delegation at the Blaj Assembly in May 1848. His poem Deșteaptă-te, române!, composition based on a popular tune of an old religious anthem, became the hymn of the revolutionaries. Nicolae Bălcescu named it "La Marseillaise of Romanians" for its ability to mobilize the people to fight. The poem later became the national anthem of Romania in 1990. He also wrote the Romanian-language version of the Kaiserhymne.

After the revolution, Mureșanu worked as a translator in Sibiu, had some patriotical works published in the Telegraful Român magazine. In 1862 his poetry was gathered in a single volume. Due to poor health conditions, he died in 1863 at Brașov. He is buried in the city’s Groaveri cemetery.
