= Peștera Vântului =

Cave in Romania

Coordinates: 46.9392°N 22.5436°E

Peștera Vântului (English: Wind Cave) is the largest cave in Romania, with a length of almost 52 km (total length of passages). It is situated in the Pădurea Craiului Mountains on the left bank of Crișul Repede River in the vicinity of Șuncuiuș village, Bihor County. This cave is closed and only accessible to cavers, but there are works going on to develop it as a show cave.

The cave is called Peștera Vântului (Romanian for "Wind Cave") because of the powerful draft that can be sensed at the entrance and in the far corners of the cave. The wind is bi-directional, being controlled seasonally.

The average temperature in the cave is 11.8˚C.
