= Ursula Ackrill =

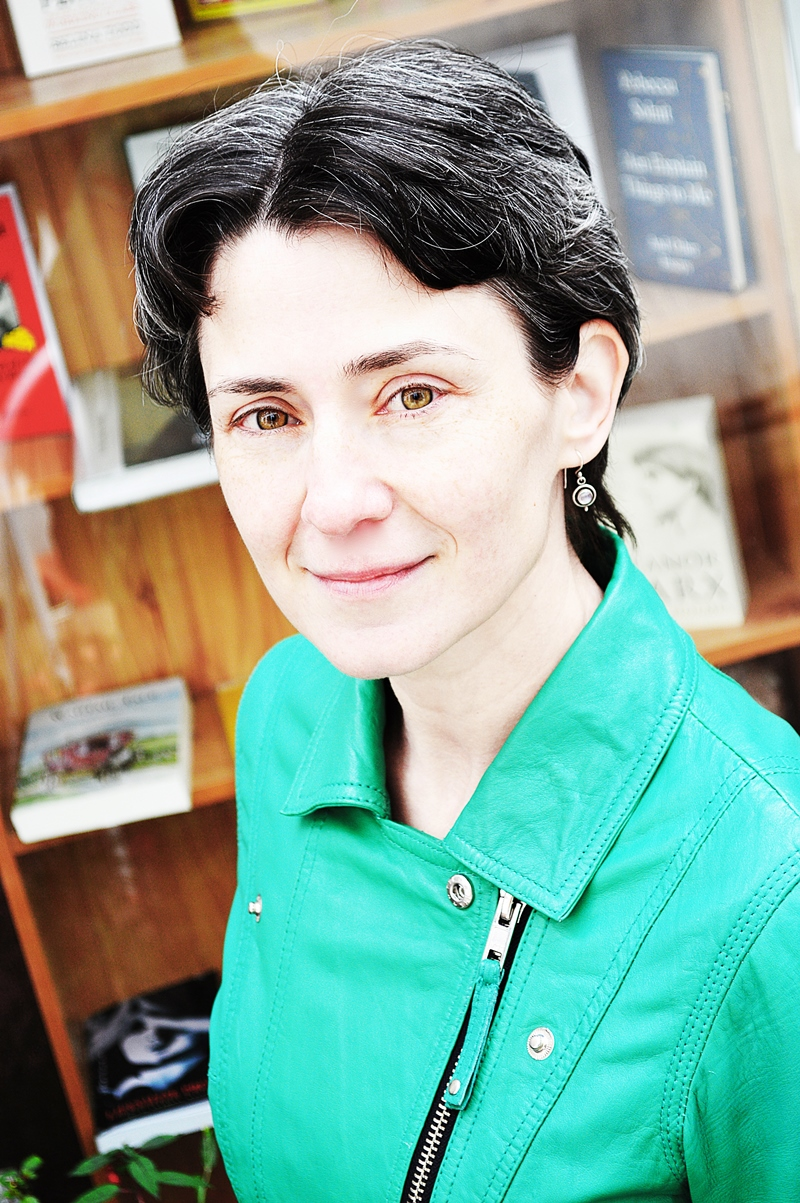
Ursula Ackrill in Nottingham

Ursula Ackrill (born 1974 in Brașov, Socialist Republic of Romania) is a Romanian German-language writer. With her debut novel Zeiden, im Januar, she was shortlisted for the Leipzig Book Fair Prize 2015.

== Life ==
Ursula Ackrill is of Transylvanian Saxon descent on her father's side, while her mother is Romanian. Her physics teacher was Klaus Johannis, from Sibiu, who became Romania’s president in 2014. Ackrill studied German studies and Orthodox theology in Bucharest, while her family had already emigrated to Germany. In 2003, she received her PhD on the writer Christa Wolf at the University of Leicester. In 2005, she obtained a Master’s degree in Information management. She is married, lives in Nottingham, and works as a librarian.

== Literary career ==
With her novel Zeiden, im Januar, which she submitted unsolicited to Klaus Wagenbach Verlag and which was accepted, she made it onto the shortlist of the Leipzig Book Fair Prize 2015.

In her book, Ackrill describes – using the example of the small town of Zeiden in the January days of 1941 – the largely unprocessed events in Transylvania during the Third Reich, when many Transylvanian Germans aligned themselves with Hitler’s Germany. She also expands her view to the situation of the German minority in relation to the Romanian state and its slogan “Romania for the Romanians”. The fate of the Jews is also central in her novel. Some of her characters are based on historical figures, such as the concentration camp doctor Fritz Klein and aviation pioneer Albert Ziegler.

== Reception ==
Critics received the complexly structured and linguistically unusual novel Zeiden, im Januar, which, similar to the literature of Herta Müller from the Banat, uses older forms of language while being very precise in detail, largely positively.

Ernest Wichner wrote that the author had developed a "tone and a use of language that transforms the linguistic otherness of that region into an artistic language. Grammatical and syntactic peculiarities of that colloquial German give the text a specific coloration, a kind of sepia sound that lends the narrated episodes historical authenticity despite their fictional character".

By contrast, Knut Cordsen criticized Ackrill’s style as an overly heavy web of metaphors; he wrote that she uses “a strangely twisted language that causes the reader to stumble on almost every page”.

== Works ==
- Metafiktion und Ästhetik in Christa Wolfs "Nachdenken über Christa T.", "Kindheitsmuster" und "Sommerstück". Würzburg: Königshausen und Neumann, 2004
- Zeiden, im Januar, Klaus Wagenbach Verlag, Berlin 2015. ISBN 978-3-8031-4177-4
- Vorstellungsgespräch in: Spiegelungen: Zeitschrift für deutsche Kultur und Geschichte Südosteuropas, issue 2, volume 10 (64), 2015
- Wie das Salz in den Speisen: Open Letter from Ursula Ackrill to the readers of her debut novel in: Siebenbürgische Zeitung, 25 October 2015
- Debate Genocide in German South West Africa: A good time for reparations in: taz, 23 October 2016
- Hagebutten im Auge des Taifuns in: die horen: Zeitschrift für Literatur, Kunst und Kritik, volume 66 (284), 2021
- Love and Rage as Life Skills pp. 108–109 in Stimmen der Rebellion: Magazin für feministische Literatur und Kunst, 2025
