= Maya Badian =

Romanian-born Canadian composer

Maya Badian (born 18 April 1945 in Bucharest) is a Romanian-born Canadian composer, musicologist, and professor.

== Biography ==
Badian began to compose at five years of age, and later attended the Bucharest National University of Music in Bucharest, where she studied with Tiberiu Olah, Aurel Stroe, Zeno Vancea and Tudor Ciortea, graduating with a master's degree in Composition in 1968. She continued her studies in orchestral conducting in Weimar, Germany during 1972.

Since 1970, Badian has been a member of the Union of Romanian Composers and Musicologists. She was music director at the Radiophonic Theatre Department of the Romanian Broadcasting Corporation from 1968 to 1972 and a music professor at the George Enescu School of Music in Bucharest between 1973 and 1985.

Emigrating with her family to Canada in 1987, she settled in Montreal. In 1990 she took Canadian citizenship, and moved to Ottawa, Ontario, in 1995. Badian is now a professor of theoretical studies, examiner, proof reader, and exam maker for the Canadian Royal Conservatory of Music Examinations and also a member of the Canadian League of Composers, and an Associate member with the Canadian Music Centre. In 1992, after two years study under André Prévost, she obtained a Doctorate in Music, Composition Diploma with the highest distinction at the University of Montréal.

She is married to Lucian Badian, a Master in Engineering; Business Manager with the Federal Government of Canada.

Maya Badian has composed works for orchestra; for instrumental and vocal ensembles; for choir; music for instrumental theatre and for multimedia. She has over 120 published compositions, as well as musicology and pedagogy works in the Library and Archives Canada, the American Library of Congress, the International Library for Contemporary Music in Paris, and other libraries worldwide.

== Works ==
Badian has composed more than 100 works for choir, orchestra, instrumental and vocal ensembles, and also for multimedia. Selected works include:

- Canada 125, cantata
- Concerto for guitar
- Concerto for marimba and vibraphone
- Concerto for 4 timbales, trompette et cordes
- In memoriam, symphony
- Dialogues, for chamber ensemble
- Movimento for wind quintet
- Profiles for trombone solo

Her works have been recorded and issued on CD, including:

- Maya Badian : Orchestral Works by Maya Badian and Romanian National Radio Orchestra (Audio CD - 22 Jan 1999)
