= Constantin Lecca =

Romanian painter and art professor (1807–1887)

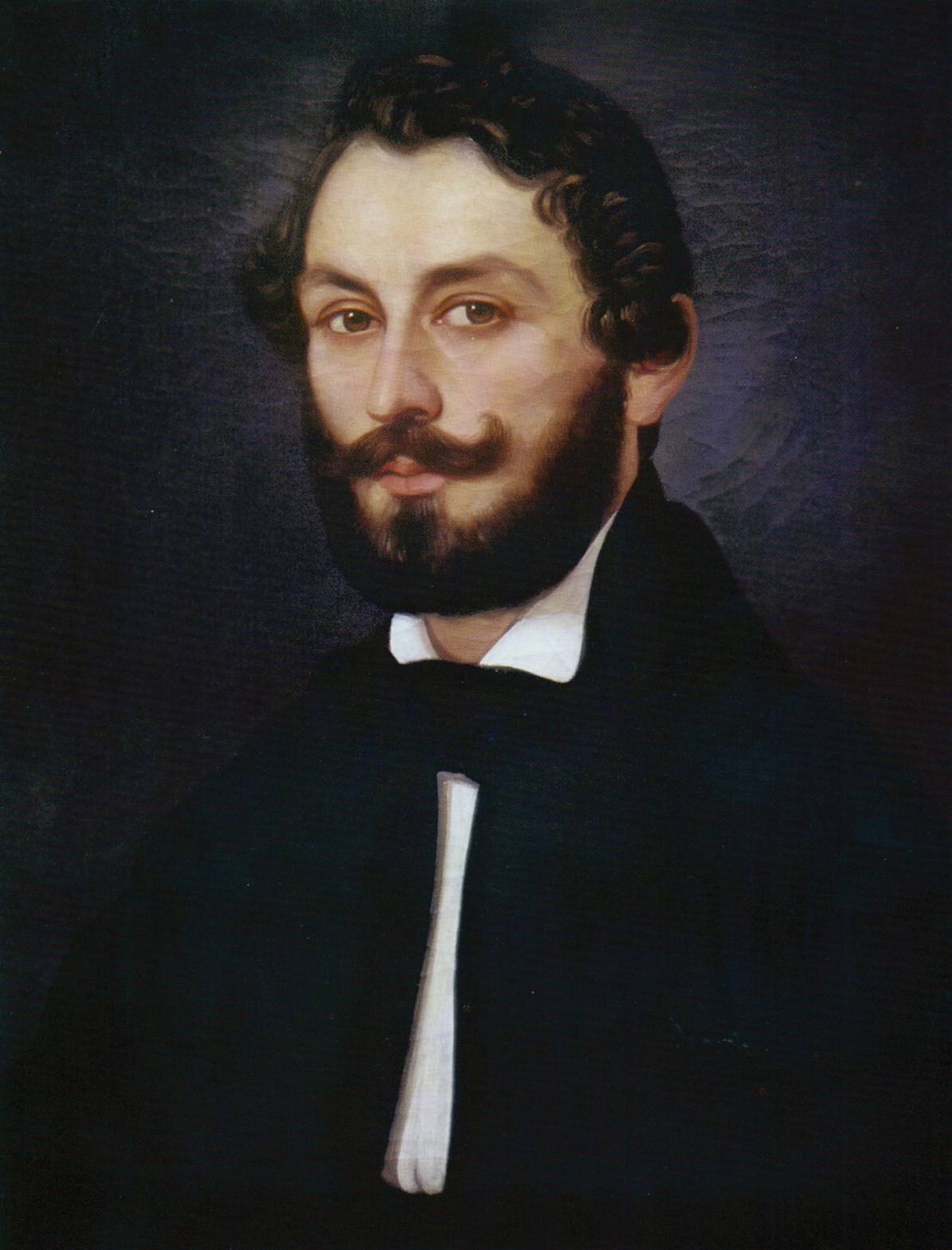
- Self-portrait (date unknown)
- Born: 4 August 1807; Kronstadt, Austrian Empire
- Died: 13 October 1887 (aged 80); Bucharest, Kingdom of Romania
- Resting place: Bellu Cemetery, Bucharest
- Known for: painting, mural
- Movement: Academism

Signature
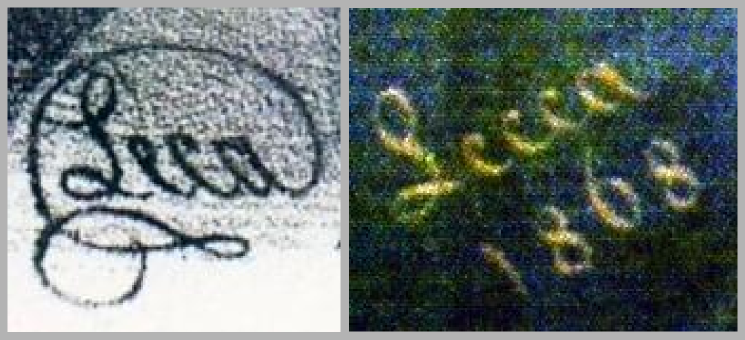

Constantin Lecca (Romanian pronunciation: [konstanˈtin ˈleka]; 4 August 1807 – 13 October 1887) was a Romanian painter and art professor. He was the first Romanian artist to create Western-style religious paintings. Although he worked in a variety of genres, including history painting, he is best known for his portraits.

== Biography ==
He was born into a family of merchants. In 1827, he went to Buda to study painting, but it is not known where or with whom he studied, so he may have been essentially self-taught. In any event, he made his first contacts with Romanian revolutionaries and became a friend of Zaharia Carcalechi, contributing articles, translations and portraits to his Romanian Library.

In 1833, he accepted an invitation to teach at the "Școala Centrală" (Central School) in Craiova. Five years later, he became the founder and editor of one of Romania's first cultural magazines, Mozaicul. He also started a family and was sufficiently successful to travel extensively, including a trip to Paris from 1847 to 1848, where he joined the circle of Romanian patriots, centered around Nicolae Bălcescu and Dimitrie Bolintineanu, among others.

When he returned home, he participated in the Wallachian Revolution of 1848, having to quit his position and leave his family for fear of reprisals. After remaining under cover in his hometown for a time, he was able to secure a professorship at Saint Sava National College, thanks to the intercession of Petrache Poenaru. One of his best-known students was Theodor Aman.

For the next fifteen years, he collaborated with Mișu Popp, painting murals at several churches throughout Bucharest and the nearby countryside. Among them was the Curtea Veche Church, the oldest religious building in Bucharest that has not been significantly altered. It was at this time that he also established his reputation as a portrait painter.

In 1870, illness forced him to retire and he painted little, although he lived for seventeen more years.

== Selected paintings ==
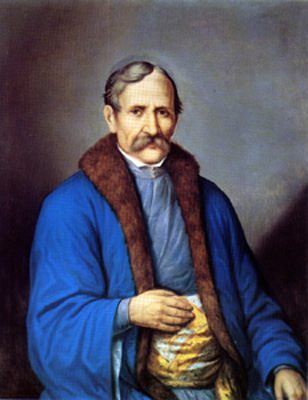
An Old Man

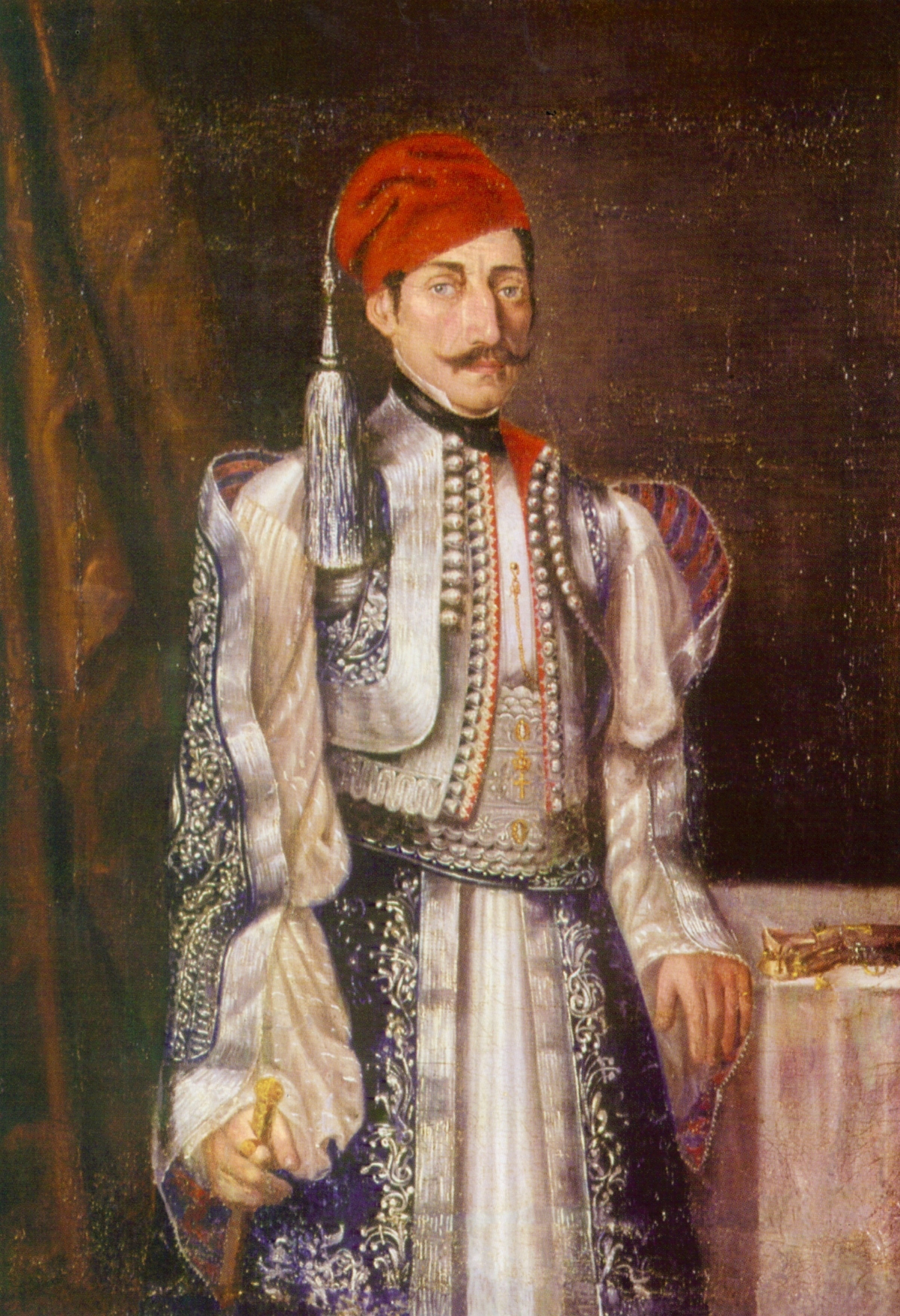
An Albanian

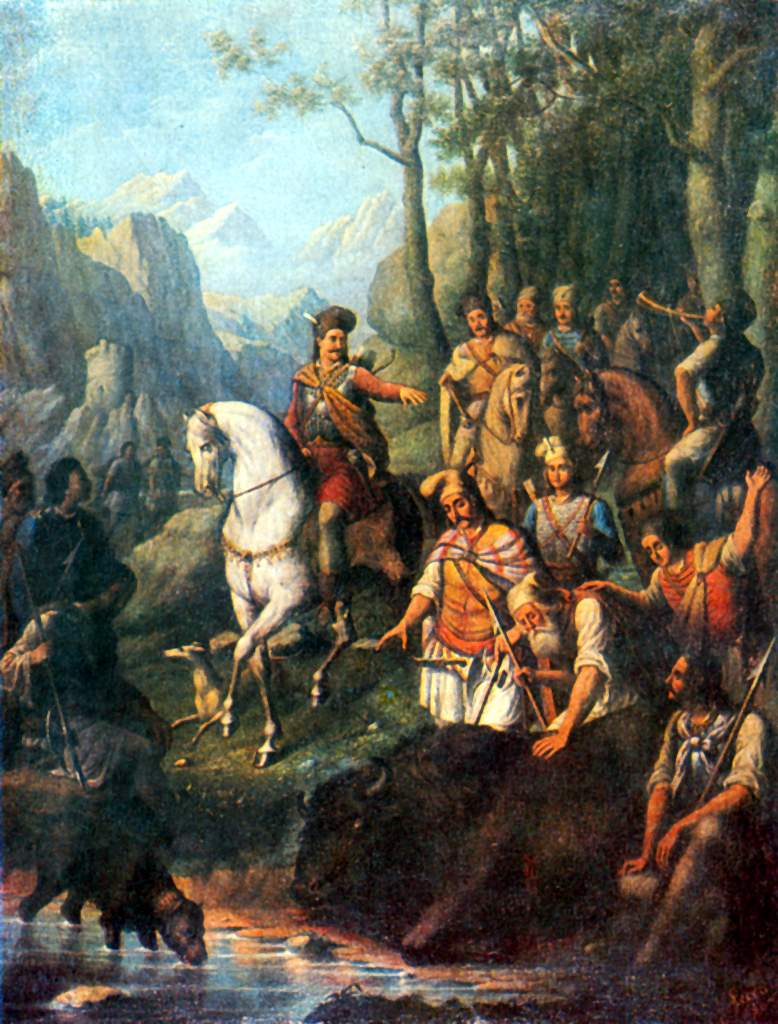
Dragoș Vodă
Hunting Bison

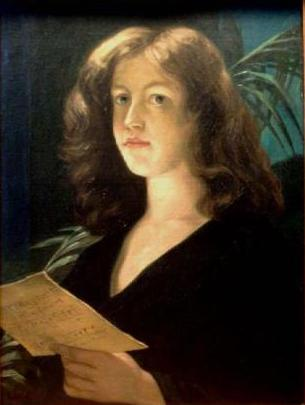
Lady Reading
a Musical Score

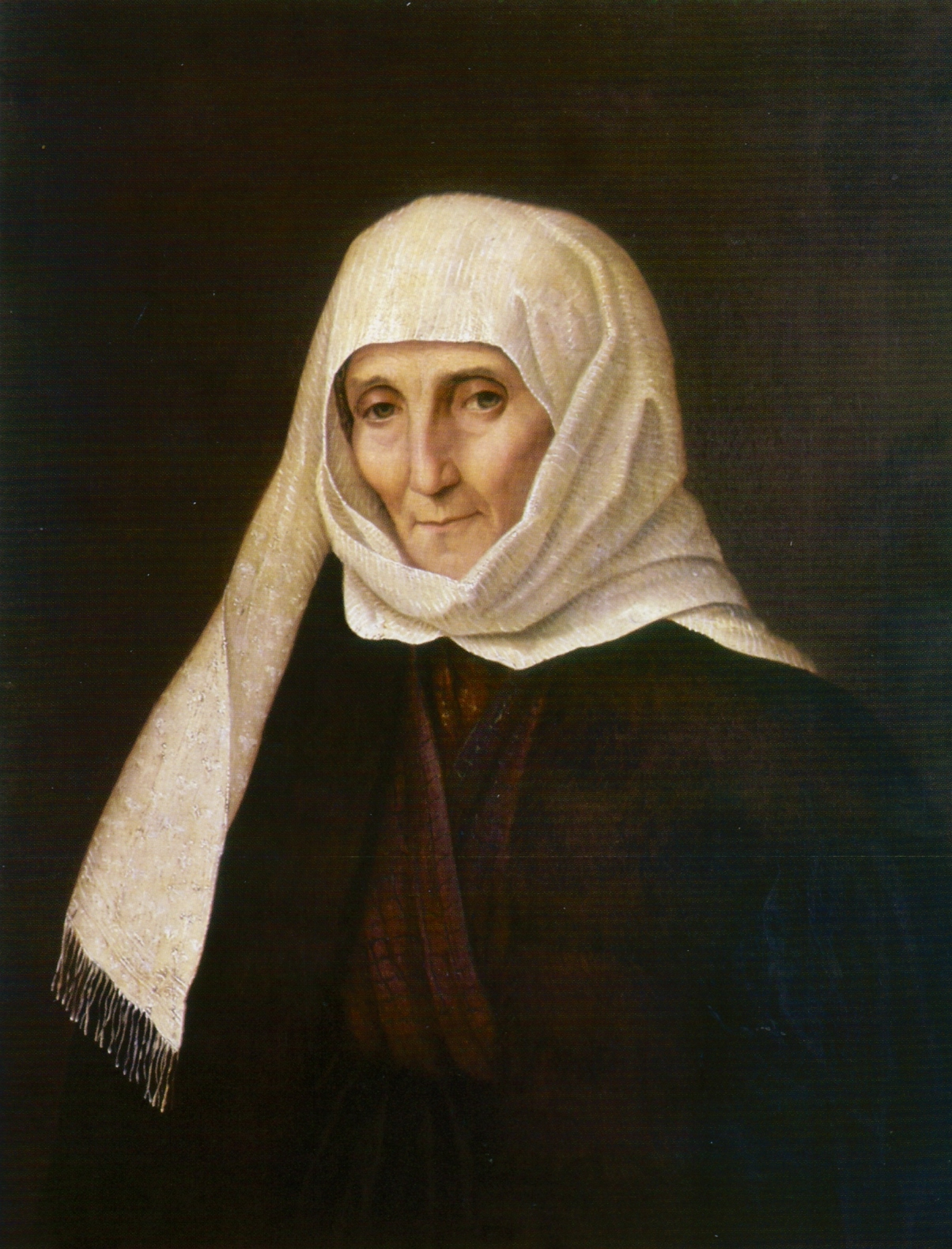
Titu Maiorescu's Mother, Maria
