= Șchei =

Romanian and Albanian exonym for Bulgarians

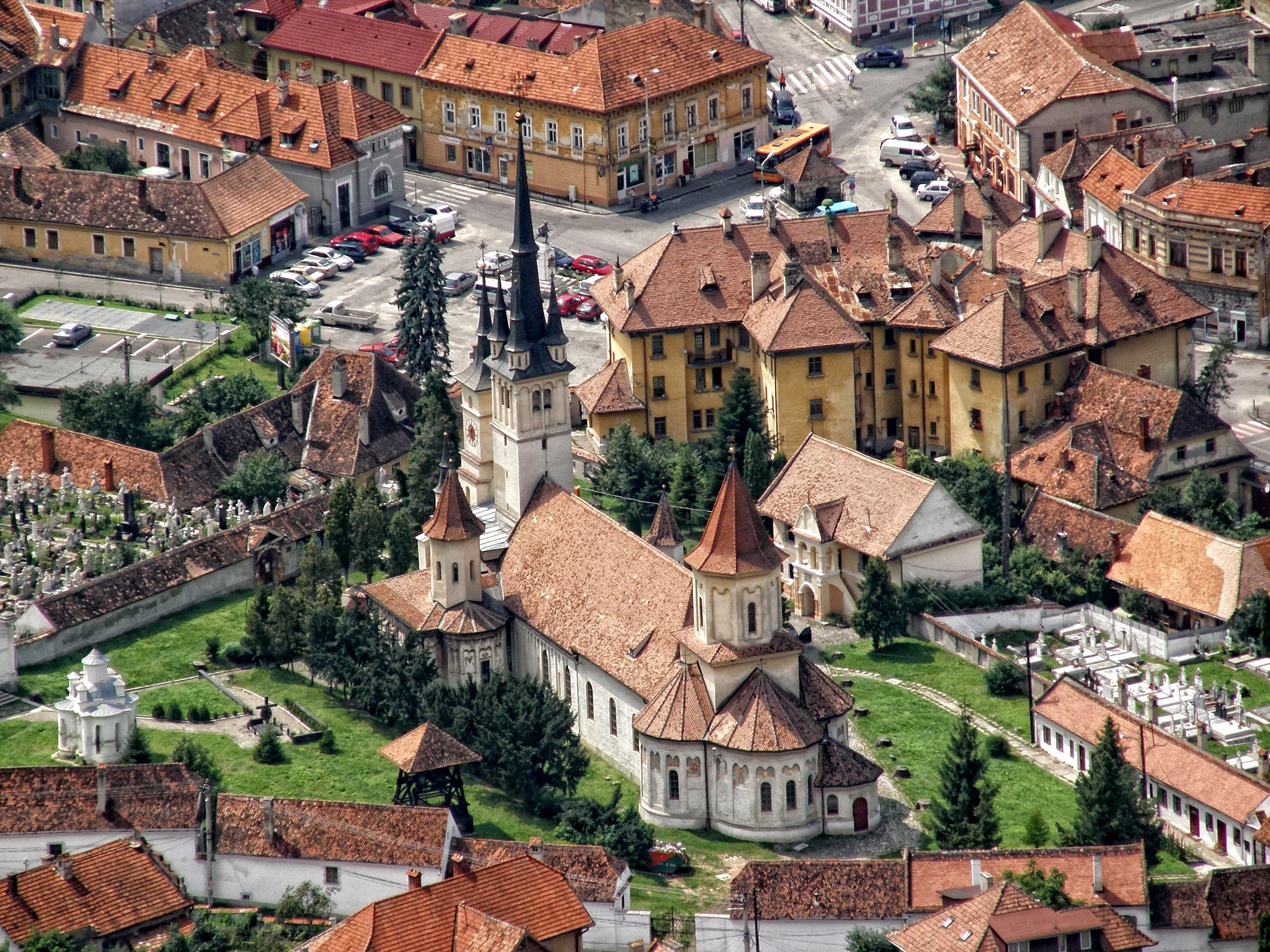
Aerial view of St. Nicholas Church, Șcheii Brașovului.

Șchei (Bulgarian: шкеи, shkei) was an old Romanian exonym referring to the Bulgarians, especially in Transylvania and northern Wallachia. As a name, it has been preserved in the names of towns colonized in the 14th century by Bulgarians, in toponyms (Dealu Schiaului near Rășinari), hydronyms (Schiau River, tributary to the Argeş River), surnames (Schiau, Șchiau). The word is thought to derive from Latin sclavis, a popular designation for the South Slavs (Bulgarians and Serbs in particular) that is still used in Albanian (in the form shkja and various dialectal variants).

== Șchei villages in Transylvania ==
Among the towns or neighbourhoods bearing that trace of Bulgarian settlement are:

- Șcheii Brașovului in Brașov (Hungarian: Bolgárszeg, German: Belgerei, traditional Romanian name: Bulgărimea)
- Cergău Mic in Alba County (archaic Romanian: Cergău Șcheiesc, archaic Hungarian: Bolgárcserged)

Other places in Transylvania that used to be inhabited by various waves of Bulgarians were Cergău Mare, Bungard, Vințu de Jos, Deva, Rusciori and Râșnov.

== Șchei villages in Wallachia and Moldavia ==
- Șchei, a quarter and former independent settlement in Câmpulung settled by Bogomil Bulgarians.
- Schiau village in Bascov commune, Argeș County
- Schiau (Urlați) and Schiau (Valea Călugărească) in Prahova County
- Șcheia commune in Suceava County
- Șcheia commune in Iași County
- Șcheia village in Alexandru Ioan Cuza commune, Iași County
