= Cergău =

- Commune
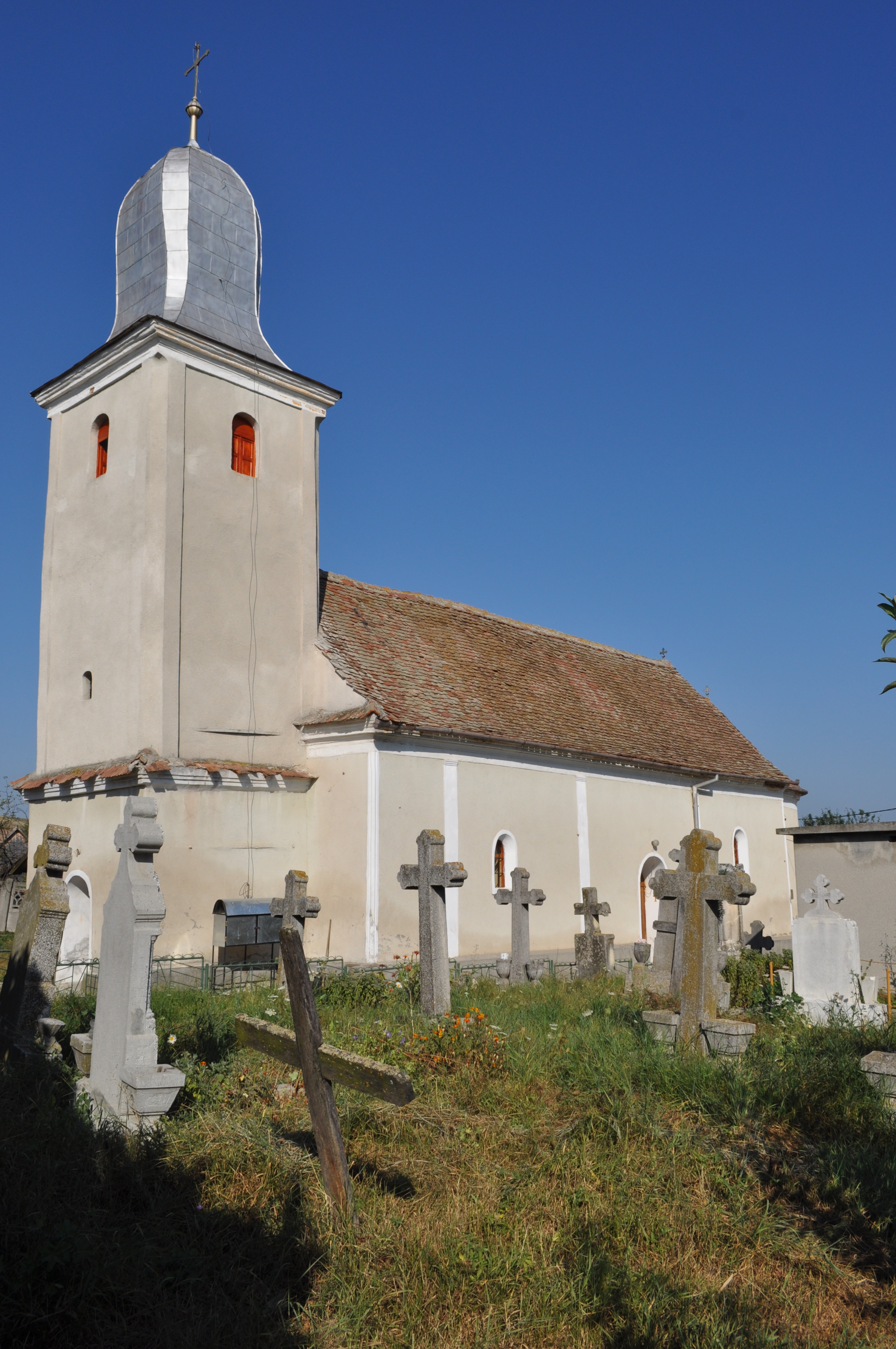
- Orthodox Church of the Annunciation in Cergău Mare (1804)

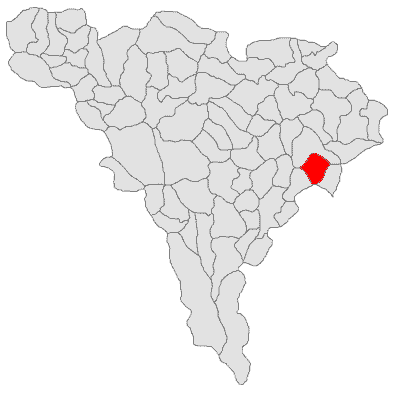
- Location in Alba County

- Location in Romania
- Coordinates: 46°6′N 23°55′E
- Country: Romania
- County: Alba

Government
  - Mayor (2020–2024): Lenuța Aldea (PNL)
- Area: 48.42 km^{2} (18.70 sq mi)
- Elevation: 310 m (1,020 ft)
- Population (2021-12-01): 1,509
  - Density: 31.16/km^{2} (80.72/sq mi)
- Time zone: UTC+02:00 (EET)
  - Summer (DST): UTC+03:00 (EEST)
- Postal code: RO–517216
- Area code: (+40) 02 58
- Vehicle reg.: AB
- Website: www.primariacergau.ro

Cergău (German: Schergied; Hungarian: Cserged) is a commune located in Alba County, Transylvania, Romania. It has a population of 1,509 as of 2021 and is composed of three villages: Cergău Mare (the commune centre; Magyarcserged), Cergău Mic (Bolgárcserged), and Lupu (Farkastelke).

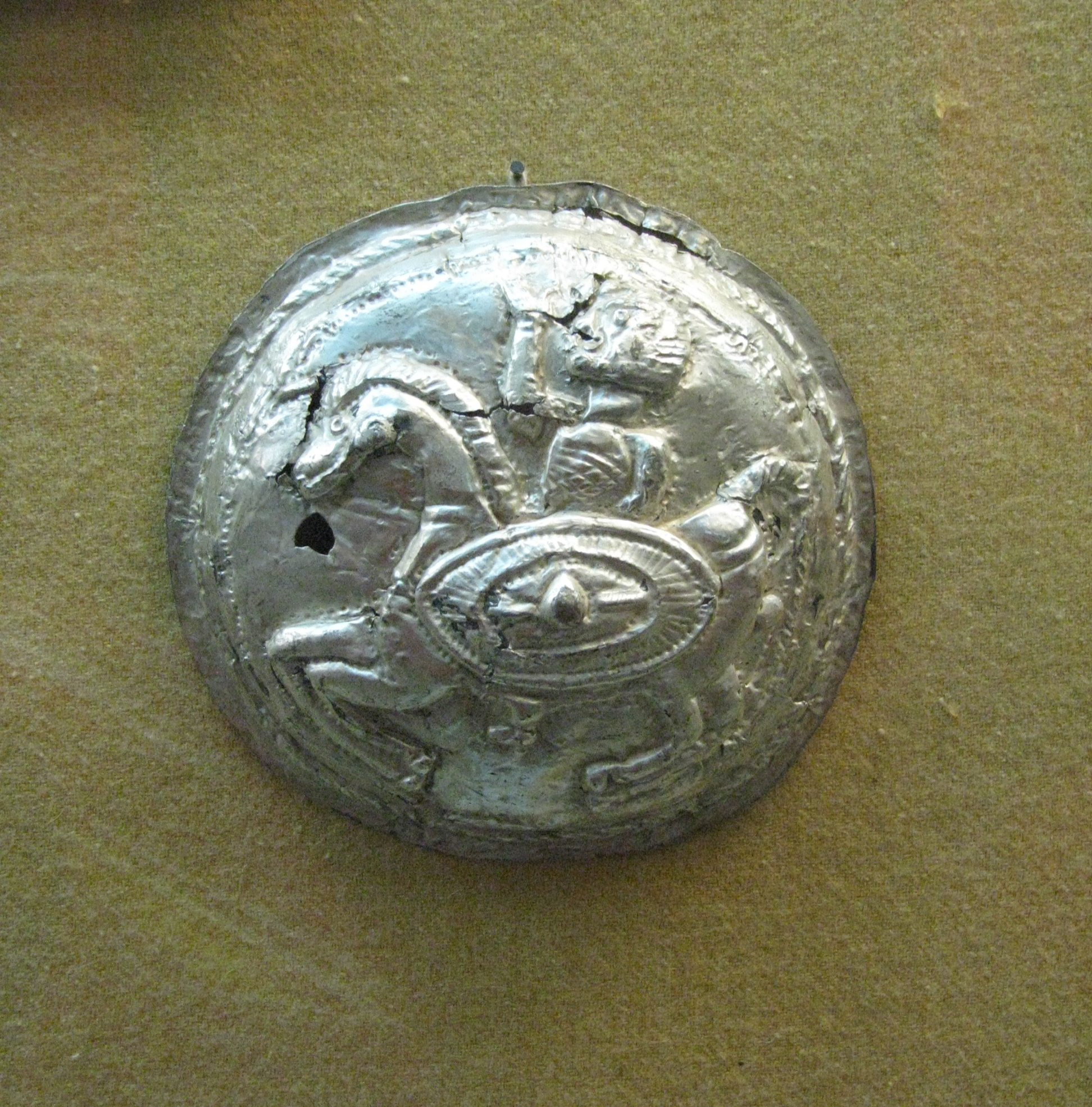
Circular phalera having the representation of a horseman with shield. Part of the Dacian Silver Hoard of Lupu, 1st century BC. Found at Lupu in 1978. It has military and religious significance, being a representation of a God of War, possibly related to the Thracian Rider.

Historical population
Year	Pop.	±%
1850	2,256	—
1880	2,230	−1.2%
1900	2,544	+14.1%
1920	2,783	+9.4%
1941	3,351	+20.4%
1977	2,251	−32.8%
1992	1,794	−20.3%
2002	1,747	−2.6%
2011	1,490	−14.7%
2021	1,509	+1.3%
Source: Census data

== Cergău Mic ==
The village of Cergău Mic was first mentioned in 1303 as Bolgarchergewd and in 1306 as Chergeod Bulgaricum. The first reference is the earliest evidence to the presence of the village's Bulgarian population. The prevalent theory is that Bulgarians arrived as refugees from the Vidin region (in modern northwest Bulgaria) and possibly from the Svishtov region (north central Bulgaria). These groups were originally of the Bogomil and Paulician sects respectively and were subject to religious persecution by the Eastern Orthodox authorities of the Second Bulgarian Empire. With their settlement in Transylvania, the Bulgarians of Cergău Mic adopted Roman Catholicism and subsequently Protestantism (Lutheranism) because they regarded these confessions as closest to their original beliefs among the denominations tolerated in Transylvania.

As late as 1995, researcher Todor Balkanski reports that many of the locals were eager to identify as Bulgarians, even though they had undergone a complete language shift from Bulgarian to Romanian. The name "Șchei", an old Romanian ethnonym for Bulgarian people, was also in widespread use as a self-identifier, its meaning equated to "Bulgarian" by the locals. In 1995, a 75-year-old local, Linca Secel, was able to recite two prayers in a Bulgarian dialect by heart, with no understanding of the meaning. With some differences, one of the prayers was also recorded by Lyubomir Miletich in 1896 and by Ion Mușlea in 1927. The gradual linguistic Romanianization of the Bulgarians in Cergău Mic is attested in 1808 with the first reference to the modern Romanian name of the village, Cergău Mic.

In the 1930 census, the village had a population of 830, of whom 762 identified as Romanians, 58 as Gypsies, 8 as Germans, 2 as Hungarians, and none as Bulgarians. Confessionally, 443 people were Lutheran, 351 Greek Catholic, 25 Baptist, 10 Orthodox, and 1 Reformed.

The historically Bulgarian population of Cergău Mic may be related to that of other historically Bulgarian villages in Transylvania proper, such as the commune centre Cergău Mare, Rusciori and Bungard in Sibiu County, and the Șchei neighbourhood of Brașov.

=== Toponymy ===
- historical Romanian name: Cergău Șcheiesc, "Cergău of the Șchei [Bulgarians]";
- Hungarian: Bolgárcserged, "Bulgarian Cserged", from 1625 to 1911 Kis Cserged or Kiscserged, "Little Cserged";
- Transylvanian Saxon dialect: Schergit; German: Klein Schergied, Kleinschergied, "Little Schergied";
- conjectured historical Bulgarian name: Чергов, Chergov
