= Țara Bârsei =

Historic and ethnographic area in Transylvania, Romania

Coordinates: 45°43′N 25°35′E

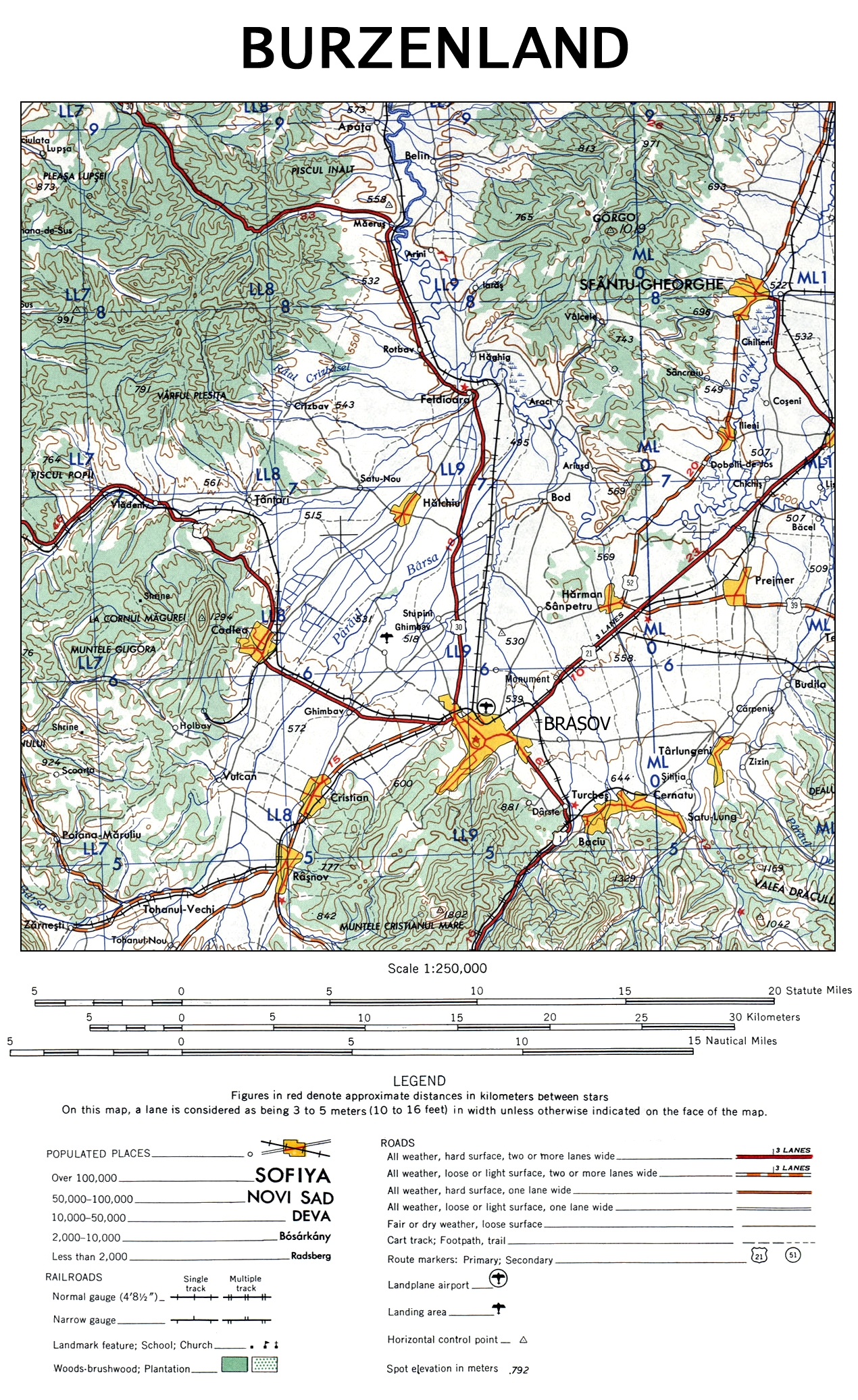
1959 map of Țara Bârsei

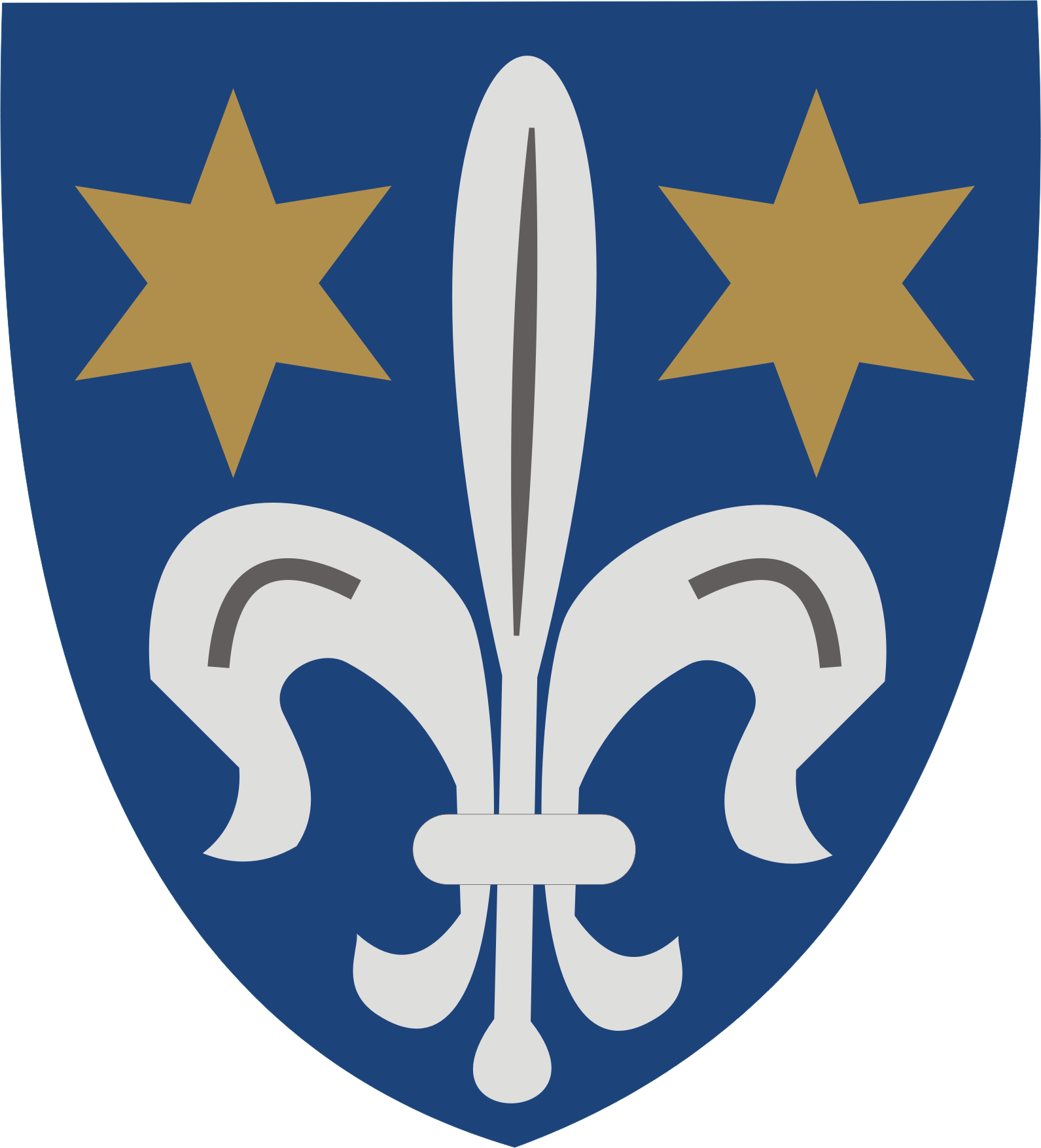
The coat of arms of Țara Bârsei

Țara Bârsei (German: Burzenland; Hungarian: Barcaság) is a historic and ethnographic area in Brașov County, southeastern Transylvania, Romania with a mixed population of Romanians, Germans, and Hungarians.

== Geography ==
Țara Bârsei lies within the Southern Carpathians mountains ranges, bordered approximately by Apața in the north, Bran in the southwest and Prejmer in the east. It corresponds largely to the geographical area of the Bârsa Depression, the western part of the Giurgeu-Brașov Depression, and the surrounding mountains, including the Bârsa Mountains. Its most important city is Brașov. Țara Bârsei is named after the Bârsa (Barca, Burzen, 1231: Borza) stream, which flows into the Olt river. The Romanian word bârsă is of uncertain origin.

== History ==
=== Middle Ages ===
Based on archaeological evidence, it seems German colonization of the region started in the middle of the 12th century during the reign of King Géza II of Hungary. The German colonists from this region are attested in documents as early as 1192 when terra Bozza is mentioned as being settled by Germans (Theutonici).

In 1211 the region was given to the Teutonic Knights by King Andrew II of Hungary in return for guarding the southeastern border of the Kingdom of Hungary against the Cumans. While the king retained his right to mint currency and claims on gold or silver deposits that would be uncovered, he granted the Teutonic Order the right to establish markets and administer justice. The crusaders were also free from taxes and tolls. The Teutonic Knights began building wood-and-earth forts in the area and they had constructed five castles (quinque castra fortia): Marienburg, Schwarzenburg, Rosenau, Kreuzburg, and Kronstadt, some of which were made of stone. The military order was successful in reducing the threat of the nomadic Cumans. Medieval Saxons from the Holy Roman Empire developed farms and villages nearby to support the forts and settle the land. The territory was already populated at the time when was disputed. Some medieval sources indicate it was uninhabited, a view challenged by some scholars invoking archaeological and documentary evidence. Bountiful agricultural yields led to further colonization by German immigrants.

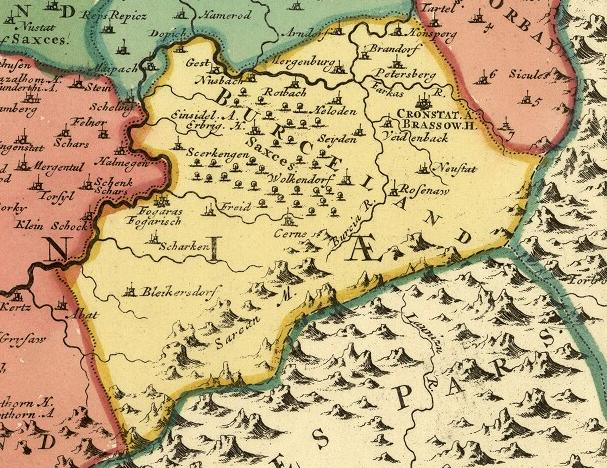
Map of Țara Bârsei from the first half of the 18th century. Brașov appears as Cronstadt/Brassow.

The Teutonic Knights disregarded the rights of the local bishopric, however, and angered Hungarian nobility which already had settlers in the region. Led by Béla, the heir to the throne, the nobility pressed the need to expel the knights upon King Andrew II after his return from the Fifth Crusade. Grand Master Hermann von Salza attempted to loosen the Order's ties to the Hungarian crown by drawing closer to the Papacy. Andrew subsequently evicted the Order with his army in 1225, although Pope Honorius III protested to no effect. The confusing status of the Teutonic Knights within the Kingdom of Hungary led Hermann von Salza to insist upon autonomy before committing the military order to Prussia.

Along with Germans, the kings of Hungary also settled Szeklers and Pechenegs in the region during the 12th and 13th centuries. Archaeological evidence for the same period also suggests a strong Romanian population inhabiting the villages later known as Șcheii Brașovului, Satulung, Baciu, Cernatu, and Turcheș (the former is today part of Brașov, while the latter four are today part of the adjacent town of Săcele). In the second half of the 13th century the Romanian population is attested in two documents: in the region of Bran (1252) and Tohani (1294), while in the second half of the 15th century out of nine villages from the domain of Bran seven were Romanian (villae valachicales, Bleschdörfer) and only two German.

At the Conference of Lutsk in 1429, Sigismund, Holy Roman Emperor and King of Hungary, suggested that the Teutonic Knights defend the region during the Ottoman wars in Europe. Led by Claus von Redewitz, a detachment of knights from Prussia was stationed in Țara Bârsei until half were killed during an Ottoman campaign in 1432.

In 1495, the building of the First Romanian School was constructed on the grounds of Saint Nicholas Church under the auspices of the church. Some of the first books in Romanian were printed there by deacon Coresi in the 16th century. At the same time, a school of copyists was established to translate important religious and cultural books into Romanian. The St. Nicholas Church was defined by the George Barițiu County Library of Brașov as "the most important center for the spiritual, cultural and artistic life of the Romanians in Țara Bârsei over time".

=== Early modern period ===
Representatives of the Romanian communities of Șcheii Brașovului, Țara Bârsei and Făgăraș, as well as of the "Greek" (Eastern Orthodox) company of merchants of Brașov, opposed the union of the local Romanian Orthodox Church with Rome under Atanasie Anghel in 1701.

The opposition movement, aided by Wallachian diplomacy, achieved a compromise in which the jurisdiction of the Greek Catholic bishop remained recognized but the Metropolis of Wallachia would be appealed to for the ordination of priests and other spiritual matters. The compromise lasted until 1724, when following the annexation of Oltenia into the Habsburg monarchy, the St. Nicholas Church in Șcheii Brașovului and the parishes in Țara Bârsei were subordinated to the Eastern Orthodox Bishopric of Râmnic.

=== 20th century ===
In a large popular meeting at the St. Nicholas Church convoked on 1 November 1918, the Romanian National Council of Țara Bârsei was established. It was led by an Executive Committee formed by 12 representatives from Brașov and 23 representatives from the neighbouring localities. The committee was led by Vasile Saftu, with Petru Muntean as its secretary. The council edited its own newspaper, Glasul Ardealului ("The Voice of Transylvania"), with the objective of supporting Transylvania's union with Romania, which took place on 1 December of that year.

== Demographics ==
Turkic presence in the form of Pechenegs and Oghuz Turks in the Three Seats and Țara Bârsei is attested by toponyms and written documents from the beginning of the 13th century.

Three Hungarian communities in the Seven Villages have a ritual called Borica that is unique within Țara Bârsei and among the broader dance culture of Hungarian-speakers.

Transylvanian Saxons remained in Țara Bârsei until the 20th century. Beginning in 1976, most of these Germans began to emigrate to West Germany with the approval of the Communist Romanian regime.

== Culture ==
The region is home to the protected food name with Protected Geographical Indication "Novac afumat din Țara Bârsei" ("Smoked bighead carp of Țara Bârsei").

The first issue of the regional magazine Țara Bârsei appeared in 1929 in Brașov under the coordination of Axente Banciu. The magazine was founded with the objective of highlighting the history and specificity of the region and its contribution to national Romanian culture.

== Towns ==
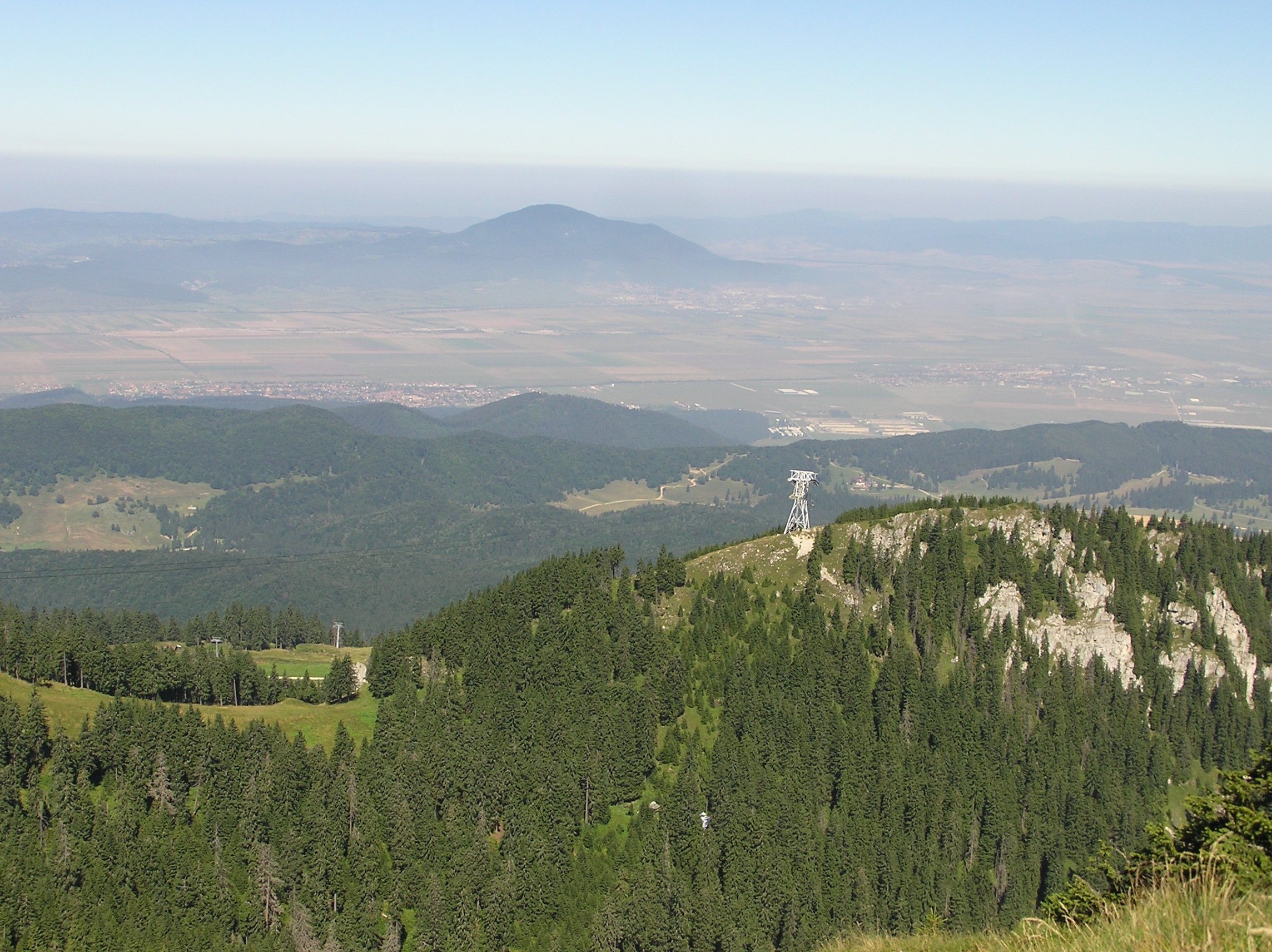
View of part of Țara Bârsei from the peak of Postăvaru. Ghimbav is on the right, while Codlea can be seen in the distance on Măgura Codlei.

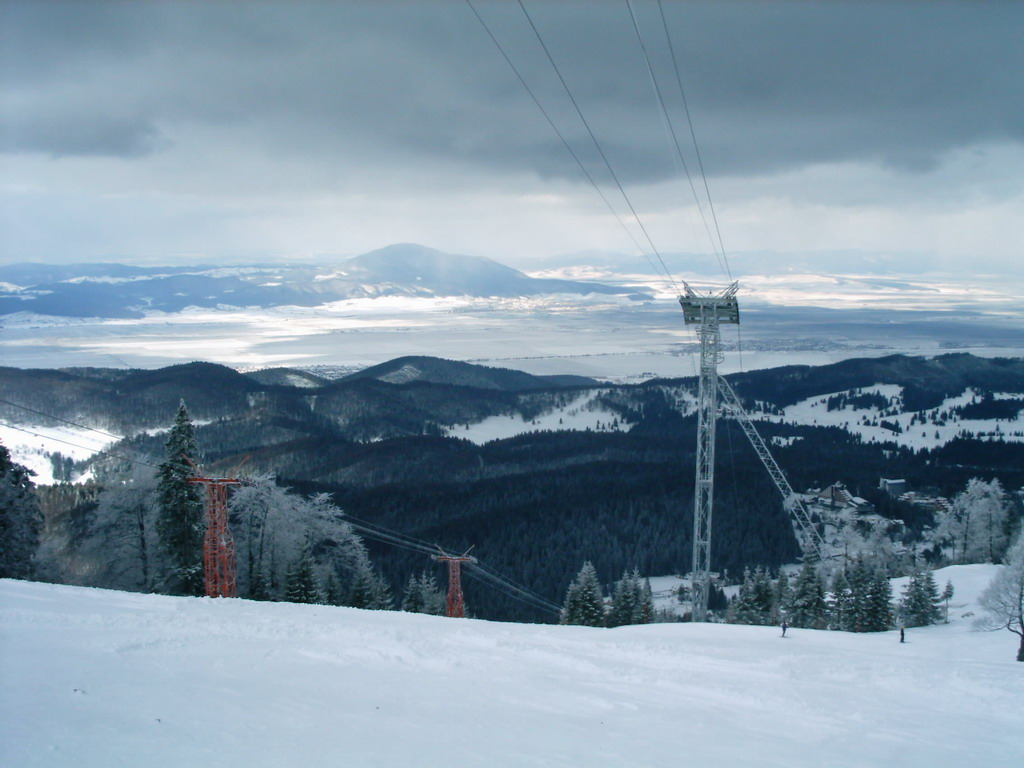
Same view in winter

In each case, the modern Romanian name is given first, followed by the German and Hungarian names.

- Apața (Geist, Apáca)
- Bod (Brenndorf, Botfalva)
- Bran (Törzburg, Törcsvár)
- Brașov (Kronstadt, Brassó)
- Codlea (Zeiden, Feketehalom)
- Cristian (Neustadt, Keresztényfalva)
- Crizbav (Krebsbach, Krizba)
- Dumbrăvița (Schnakendorf, Szunyogszék)
- Feldioara (Marienburg, Földvár)
- Ghimbav (Weidenbach, Vidombák)
- Hălchiu (Heldsdorf, Höltövény)
- Hărman (Honigberg, Szászhermány)
- Măieruș (Nußbach, Szászmagyarós)
- Prejmer (Tartlau, Prázsmár)
- Râșnov (Rosenau, Barcarozsnyó)
- Rotbav (Rotbach, Szászveresmart)
- Săcele (Siebendörfer, Szecseleváros / Négyfalu)
- Sânpetru (Petersberg, Barcaszentpéter)
- Șercaia (Schirkanyen, Sárkány)
- Vulcan (Wolkendorf, Szászvolkány)
- Zărnești (Zernescht, Zernest)

== See also ==
- Nösnerland
