= Catherine's Gate =

1559 city gate in Braşov, Romania

Coordinates: 45.639528°N 25.586092°E

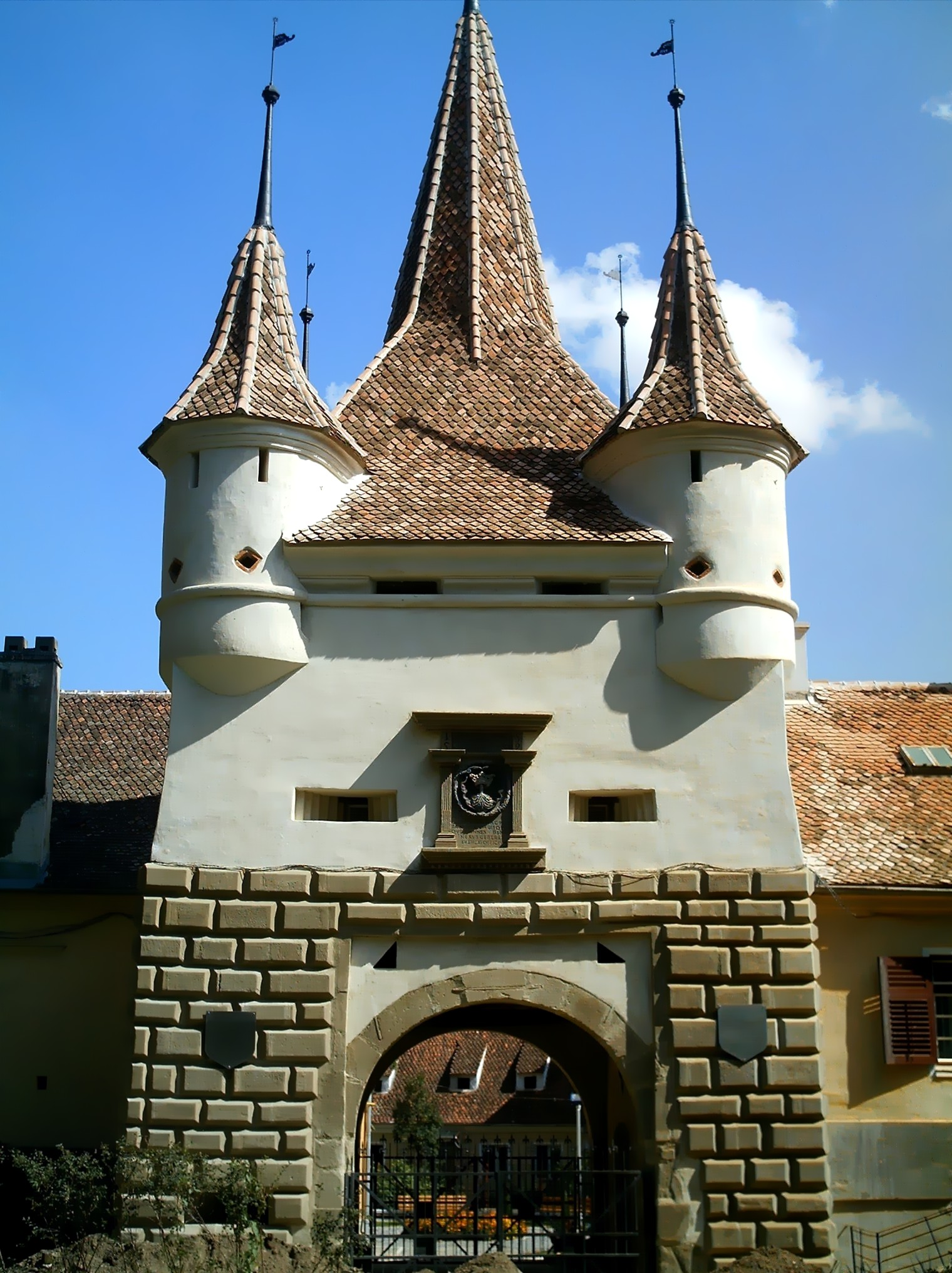
Catherine's Gate in Brașov

Catherine's Gate (Romanian: Poarta Ecaterinei, German: Katharinentor, Hungarian: Katalin-kapu) in Brașov, Romania, was built by the Tailors' Guild, in 1559 for defensive purposes to replace an old gate destroyed by a flood in 1526. It is named after St. Catherine's Monastery that was situated here in former times. It is the only original city gate to have survived from medieval times. In fact the central tower is only a part of the original gate; documents talk about the existence of a wooden structure which was demolished in 1827. The original structure can be seen at the Weaver's Bastion where the large model of Brașov in 1600 is displayed.

Old documents mention it under the name of Porta Valacce, the Vallah's Gate because it was the only entrance for the Romanians living in Șcheii Brașovului. They were not allowed to use the other four entrances. During the Saxon rule of the 13th to 17th century Romanians were forbidden from owning property inside the fortress walls and such they settled outside the wall in the neighborhood named Șcheii Brașovului. Romanians could only enter the town at certain times and had to pay a toll at the gate for the privilege of selling their produce inside the citadel.

The four small corner turrets (also seen in other Transylvanian towns) symbolize the fact that the town had judicial autonomy, and the "right of sword" (ius gladii), which was the right to decide on capital punishment. Above the entrance the tower bears the city's coat of arms, a crown on an oak tree trunk and roots.

At the present time Catherine's Gate houses a museum.

== See also ==
- Șchei Gate
