= Shkije =

Albanian ethnonym to denote non-Albanians

Shkije, shkje, shqa, or shkla(n) is an Albanian ethnonym (exonym) used to denote non-Albanians. Derived from the Latin ethnonym "Sclaveni", it is among the oldest ethnonyms used in the Albanian language. In modern Montenegro, Kosovo, Serbia and Macedonia, shkije, shkje, shkavell and similar terms acquired a pejorative connotation.

From around mid-20th century onwards, to denote Slavs Albanian lexicographers have preferred the Modern Albanian ethnonym sllav, pl. sllavë(t), which is an internationalism that has penetrated and taken hold in use over time.

== Name ==
=== Attestation ===
The ethnonym was firstly documented by the Old Albanian author Pjetër Bogdani in 1685, while the name Shkienia "Schiavonia" was documented by the Old Albanian author Frang Bardhi in 1635. However, the ethnonym has been used since the earliest contacts of Albanians and South Slavs from around the 6th century CE onwards.

=== Etymology ===
It is derived from the Latin term Sclaveni, which contained the traditional meaning of “the neighbouring foreigner”. Ethnonyms with the same origin are also found in Romance languages of the Balkans, such as Dalmatian and Eastern Romance languages (c.f. Șchei, used by Romanians to name Slavs, in particular Bulgarians).

== Usage ==
It is used in the Gheg dialect of Albanian to refer to Southern Slavs such as Serbs, Macedonians, Montenegrins, to a lesser extent Croats and Bosniaks, and also simply non-Albanians such as Greeks and Italians. The Arvanites in Greece use the version shkla to refer to the Greek population, while the Arbëreshë in Italy, a substantial part of which originates from the Arvanites, use the words shklan and shklerisht which mean "that does not speak Arbëreshë", or "that speaks an incomprehensible language", referring to the Latin languages.

It was widely used in the Albanian literature as well, i.e. Sami Frasheri in his works and Gjergj Fishta (1871–1940), notably in Lahuta e Malcís (1937).

During the Yugoslav Wars, Albanian newspapers often called Serbs Shkja.

== Word forms ==
	Indefinite Singular	Indefinite Plural	Definite Singular	Definite Plural
Nominative	një shka (a Serb male)/një shkinë(female)	shkije (Serbs)/shkina	shkau (the Serb)/shkina	shkijet/shkinat (the Serbs)
Accusative	një shka/një shkinë	shkije/shkina	shkaun/shkinën	shkijet/shkinat
Genitive	i/e/të/së një shkau/shkine	i/e/të/së shkijeve/shkinave	i/e/të/së shkaut/shkinës	i/e/të/së shkijeve/shkinave
Dative	një shkau/një shkine	shkijeve/shkinave	shkaut/shkinës	shkijeve/shkinave
Ablative	(prej) një shkau/një shkine	(prej) shkijesh/shkinash	(prej) shkaut/shkinës	(prej) shkijeve/shkinave

== See also ==
- Șchei
- Shqiptar
- List of ethnic slurs

== Bibliography ==
- Demiraj, Bardhyl (2010). "Kur etnikët tregojnë: SHQA-u ndër shqiptarë" [What Denominations Indicate: SHQA-U Amongst Albanians]. Studime (in Albanian) (16–17). ASHAK: 231–249.
