= Șchei Gate =

Coordinates: 45.639171°N 25.5864144°E

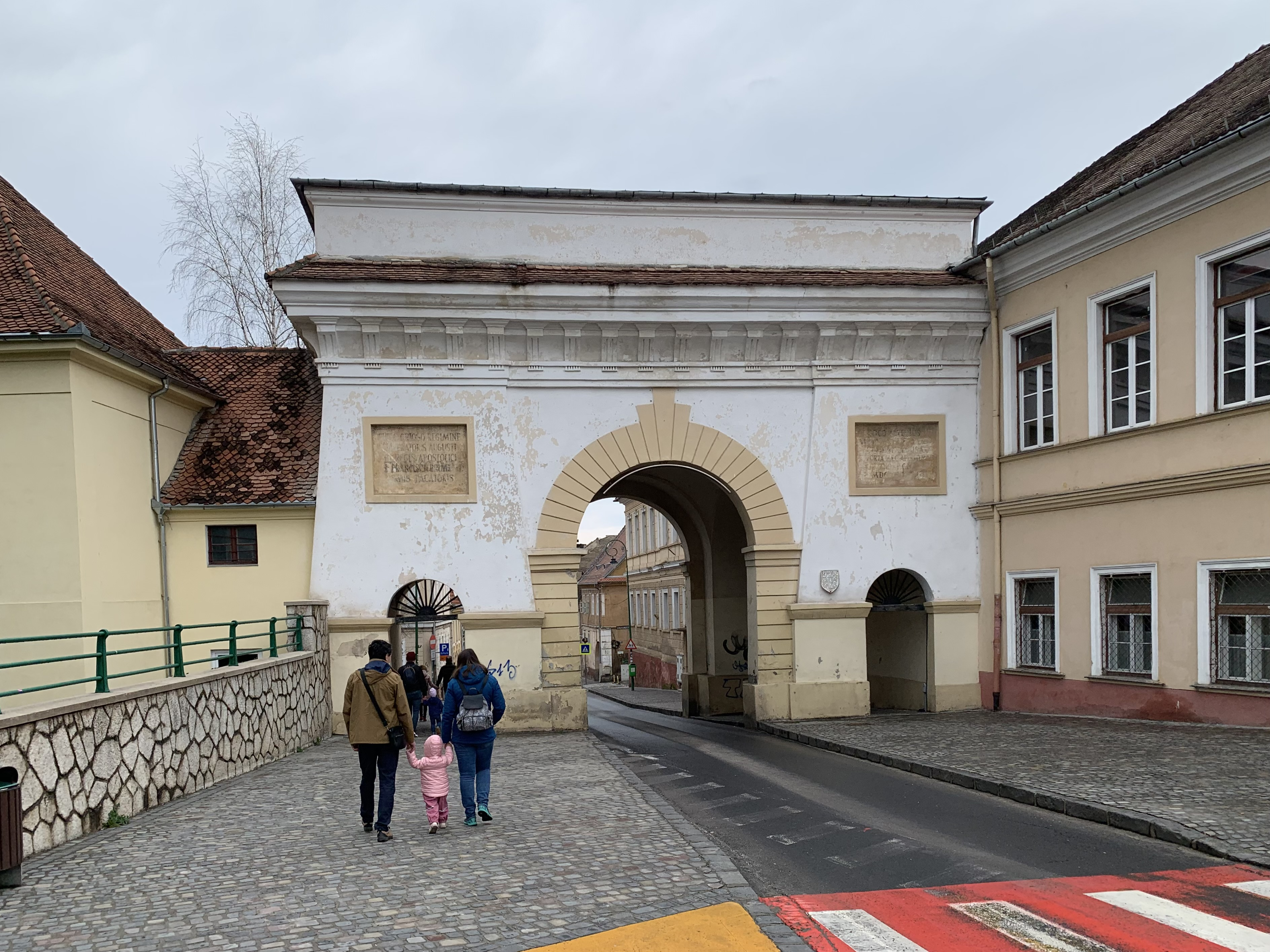
Șchei Gate of Brașov, 2023

Șchei Gate (Romanian: Poarta Șchei) in the Șcheii Brașovului neighborhood of Brașov, Romania, is right next to Catherine's Gate. It was built in between 1827 and 1828 in order to let through heightened traffic. The much bigger Catherine's Gate was demolished at the same time (1827), with the exception of the tower of the exterior gate, which was used as storage (it is now a museum).

The stone and brick gate, built in classical style like a triumphal arch, has three openings. The middle arch, shaped for traffic, is larger, and on its both sides there are two smaller and lower openings for pedestrians. The Latin inscriptions on the wall above the small arches let us know the construction date, but they also inform us that the gate was built after the Emperor of Austria, Francis I, visited Brașov in 1817.
