= Șcheii Brașovului =

Bulgarian neighborhood in Brașov, Romania

Coordinates: 45.6358°N 25.5800°E

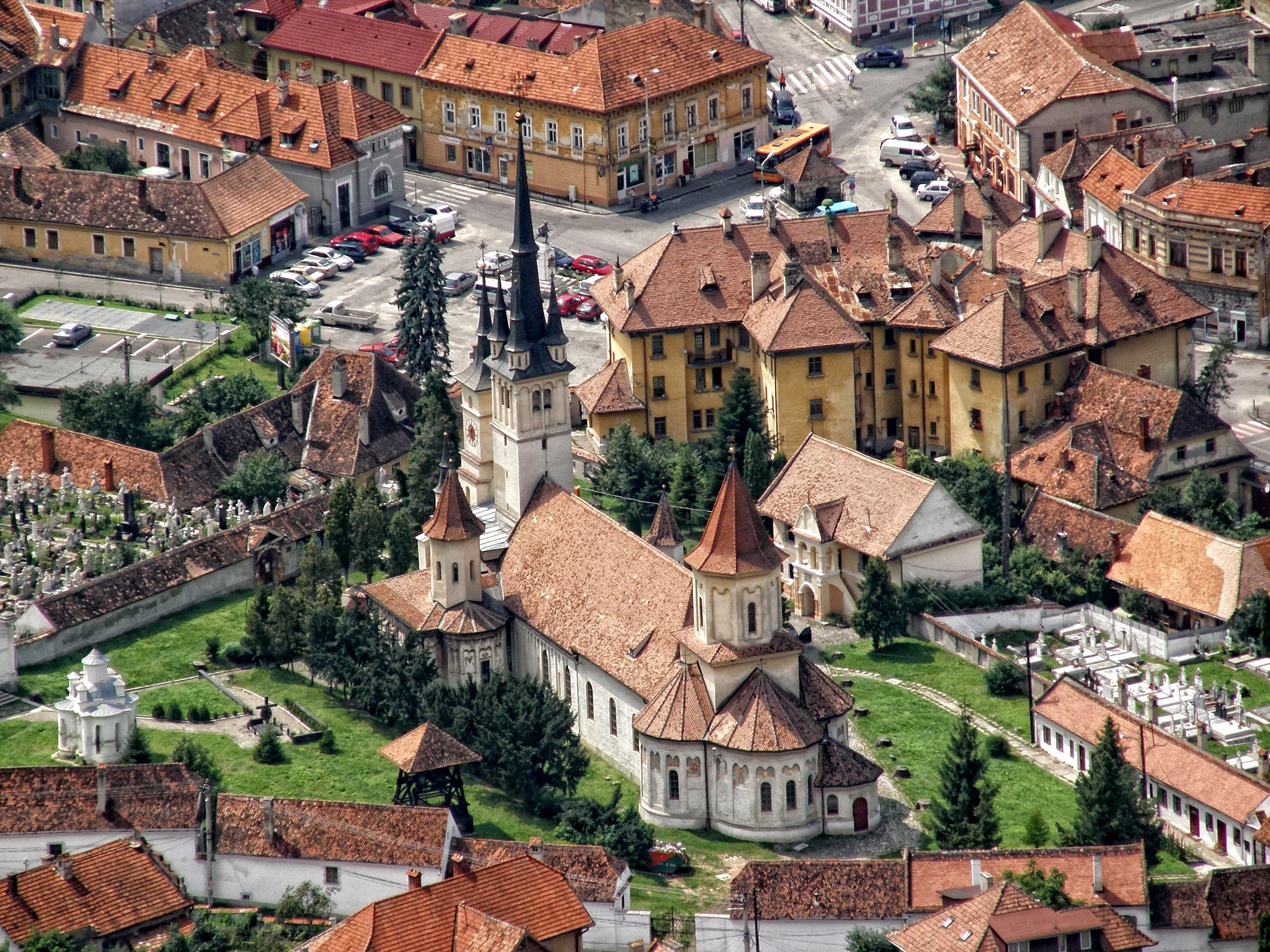
Aerial view of St. Nicholas Orthodox Church in Șcheii Brașovului

Șcheii Brașovului (Hungarian: Bolgárszeg, German: Belgerei or more recently Obere Vorstadt; traditional Romanian name: Bulgărimea, colloquially Șchei) is the old ethnically Romanian neighborhood of Brașov, a city in southeastern Transylvania, Romania.

This village-like section of the town is mostly made up of small houses built along narrow roads with gardens and small fields on the slopes of the Tâmpa Mountain.

== History ==
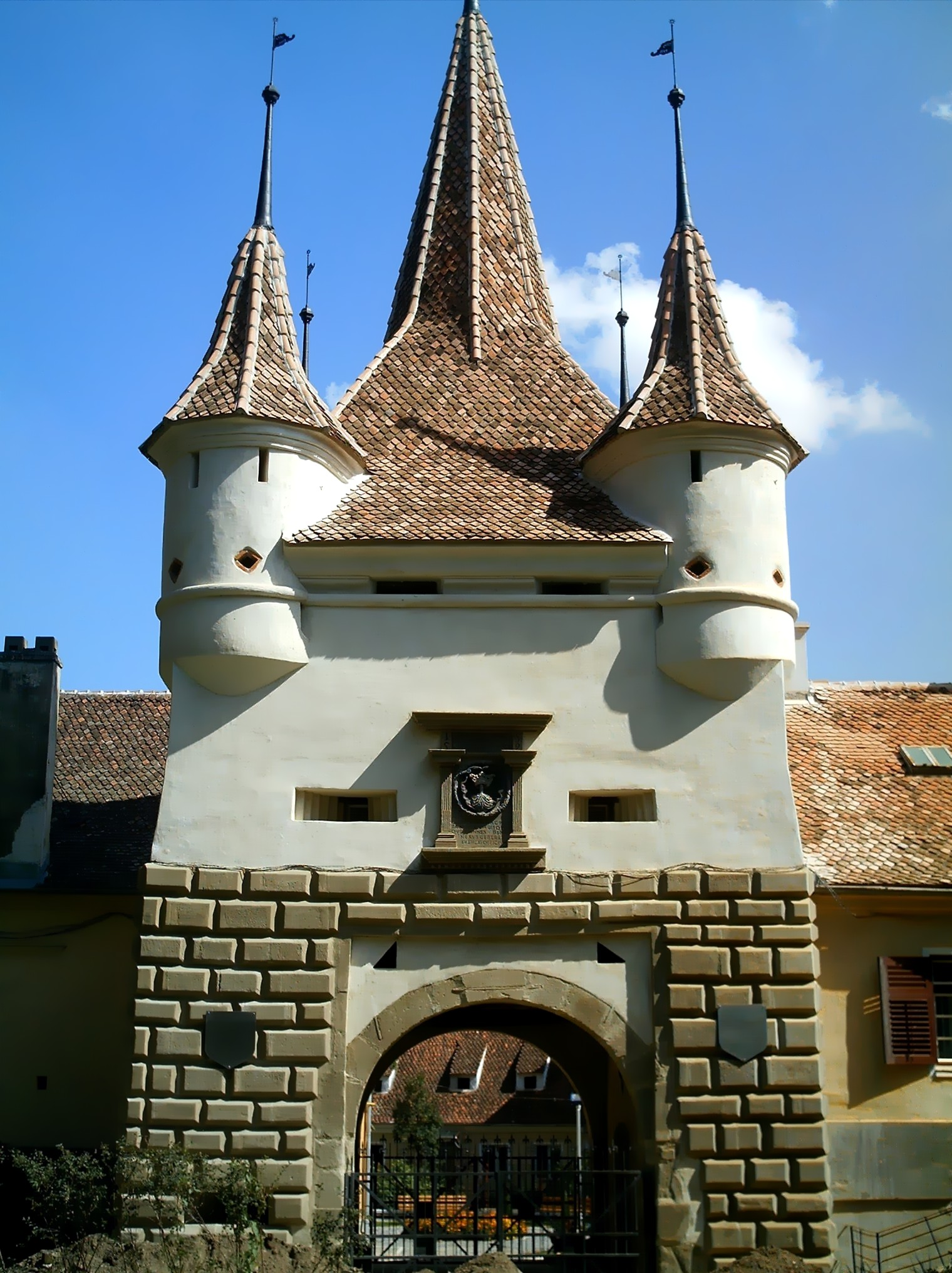
Catherine's Gate

Until the 17th century, the inhabitants of Șchei were forbidden from owning property inside the city walls. The people living in the Șchei could only enter the town at certain times and had to pay a toll at the Catherine's Gate for the privilege of selling their produce inside the town. Catherine's Gate was the only entrance for the Romanians — they were not allowed to use the other four entrances, such as the Șchei Gate. It was in Șchei that Brașov's first Romanian School was established, next to the Romanian Orthodox church of St. Nicholas.

Researchers maintain the Șchei were ethnic Bulgarians who later adopted the Romanian language and ethnic identity. The neighborhood's name has been recorded through the ages as follows: Bolgarszek (1611), Scheu Brașovului, orașul Schei lângă Cetatea Brașovolui (1700), Bolgarsek, Șchei de lângă Brașov (1701), Șchiiaii Brașovului (1708), Bolgaria Brașovului (1723), Șchei lângă cetate Brașovului unde-i zic Bolgara, Șchiai (1724), obștea din Bolgarseghi (1773), sărăcimea obștii Bolgarsegului (1774), Bolgarsec, Biserica Bolgarseghiului (1813), Bolgarsechi (1816), Bolgarsăchiu (1817), etc.

According to Radu Tempea's Istoria besérecei Șchéilor Brașovului manuscript of 1899, the Bulgarians arrived in Brașov in the late 14th century, more exactly 1392. Their arrival is linked to the reconstruction of the Black Church, which had been destroyed by the Tatars in the 13th century, the reconstruction beginning 1385.

The beginning of the construction of this neighbourhood dates according to all information that I can find to the 14th century, in which the city church began to be built in 1385. Because there was a lack of enough craftsmen for this important construction due to the Burzenland markets and villages being busy with the building of their churches and castles at the time and not being able to provide enough workers except for the supply of stones, so the people of Kronstadt were forced to let workers from the neighbouring provinces come into the city. For this reason came from Bulgaria the so-called by us Belger, who, in part because of the long work on the church construction, in part because they liked the successful times here, settled here as residents, at the place we still call the Belgerei, by the good work of the laudable Magistrate.

By the beginning of the 19th century, the Bulgarian population of Șcheii Brașovului had been gradually Romanianized. An 1829 statistic on the population of Bolgárszeg, which stated the neighbourhood had a population of 5,829, did include Bulgari ("Bulgarians") in the list along with Valachi ("Romanians"), but noted no people of that ethnicity.

== Notable people ==
- Ioan Bogdan (1864–1919), linguist, historian, philologist
- Allen Coliban (1979–), former mayor of Brașov

== See also ==
- Șchei
- Tocile Church

== Gallery ==
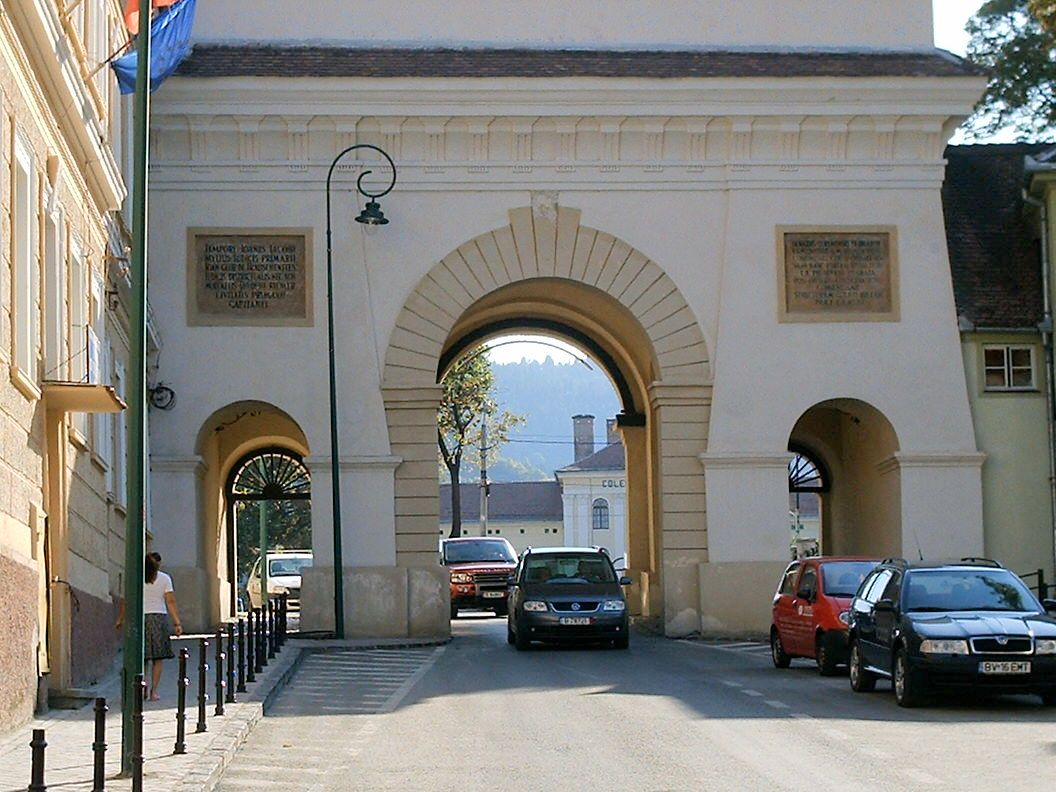
Șchei Gate

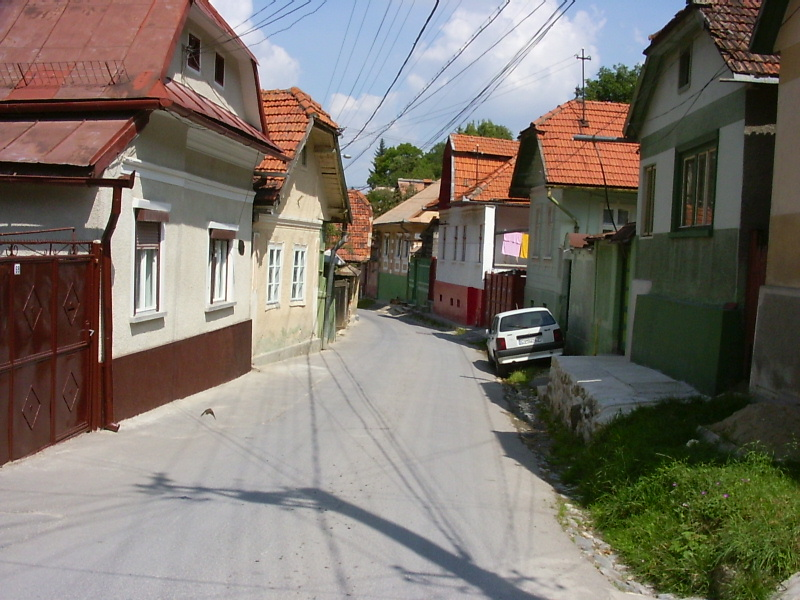
Typical street in Șcheii Brașovului

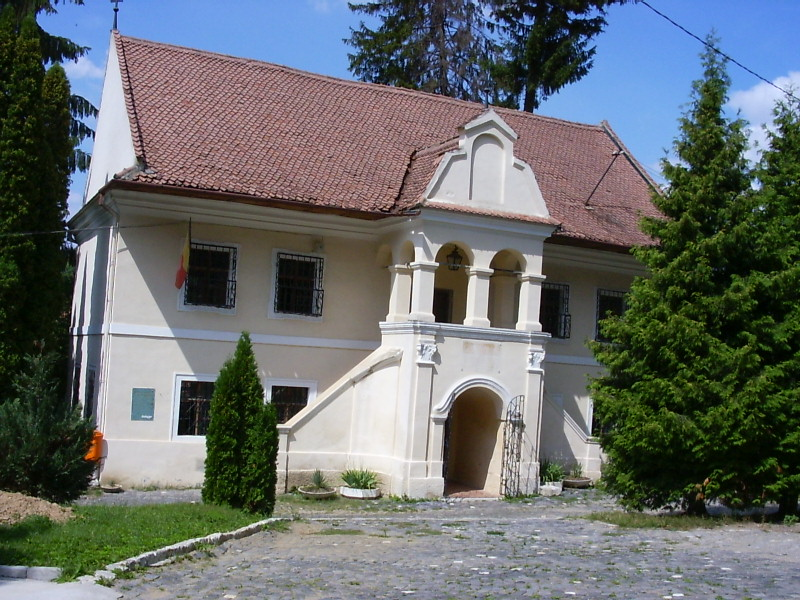
First Romanian School

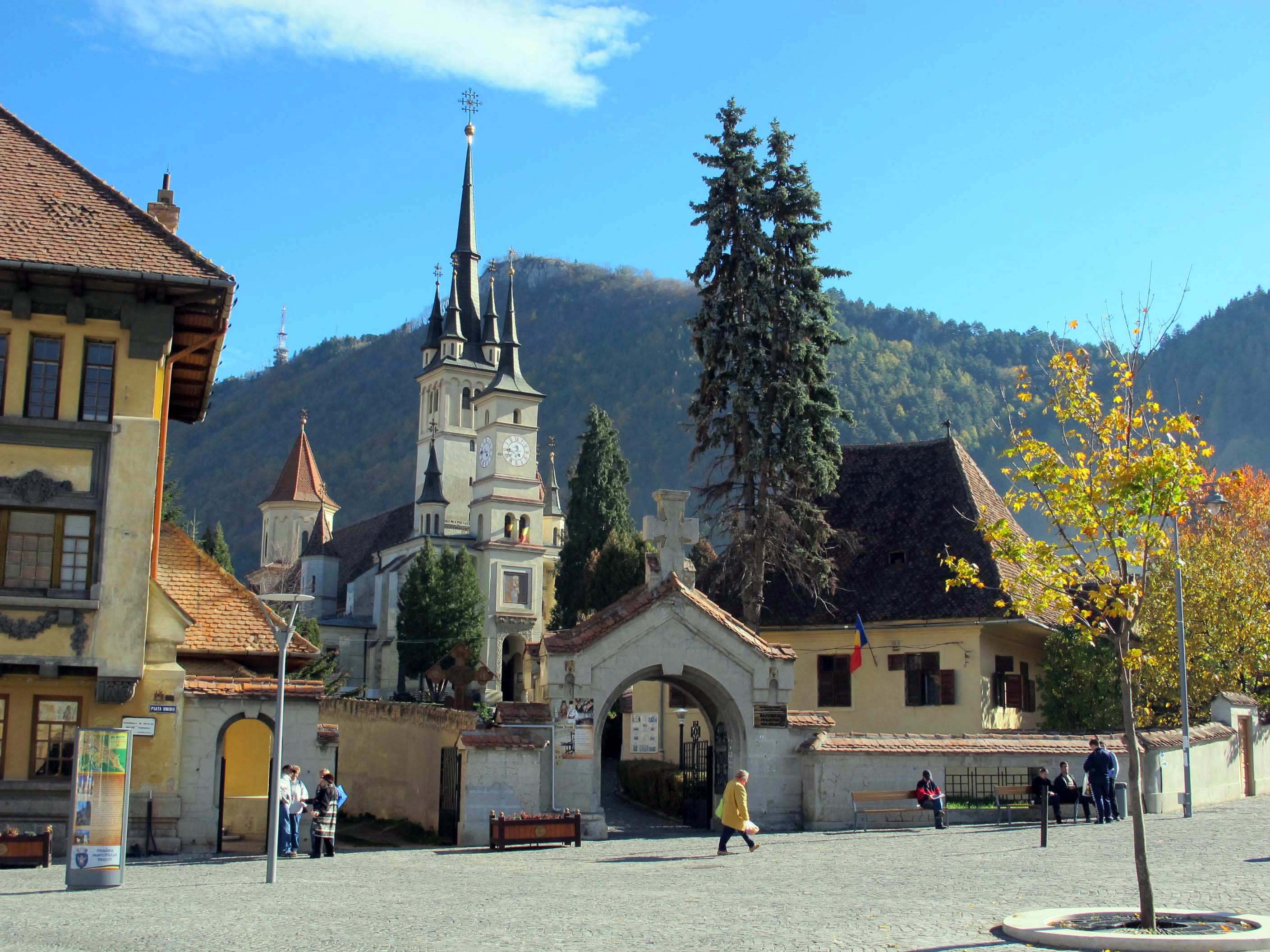
St. Nicholas Orthodox Church

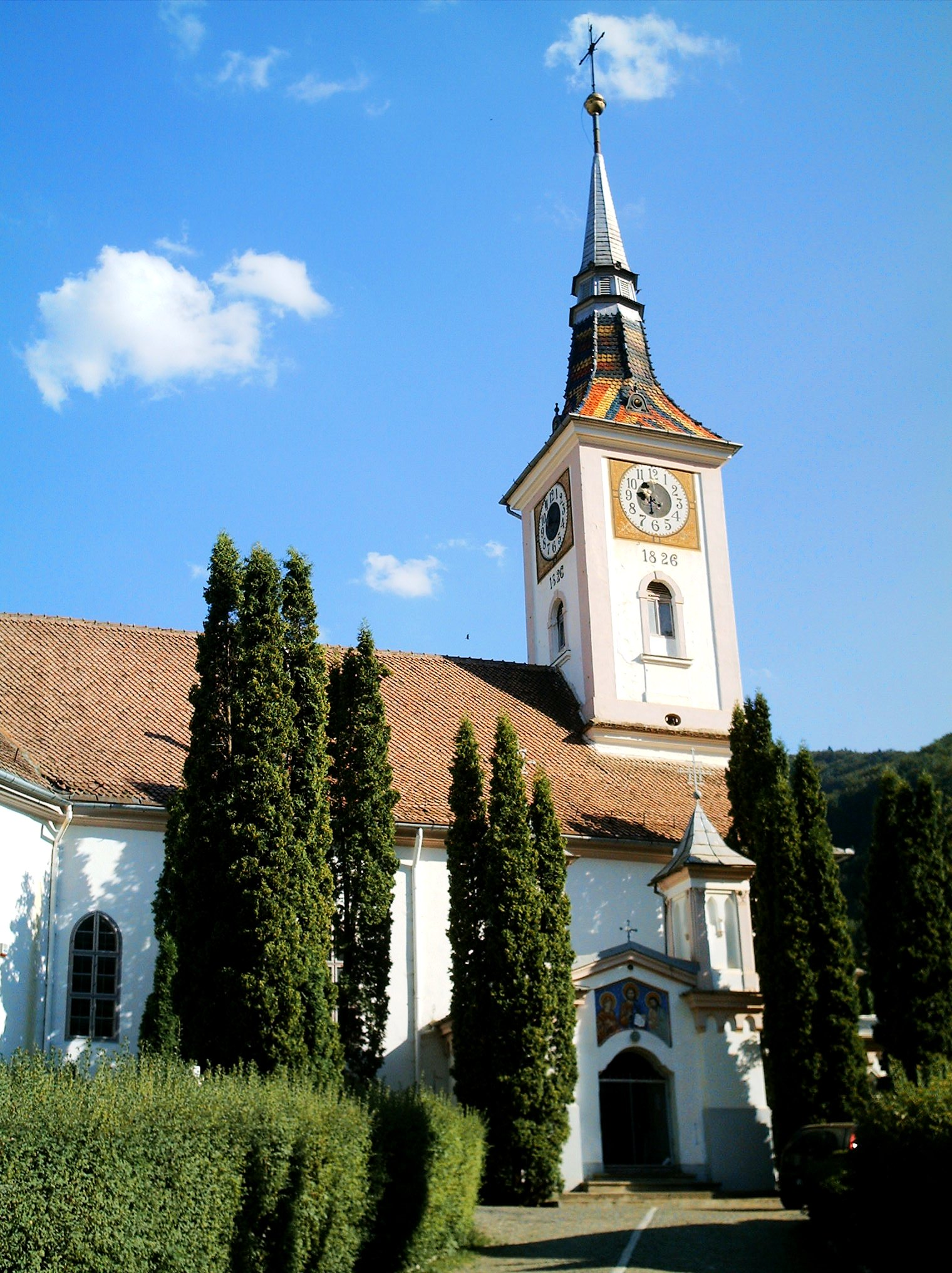
Holy Trinity Orthodox Church

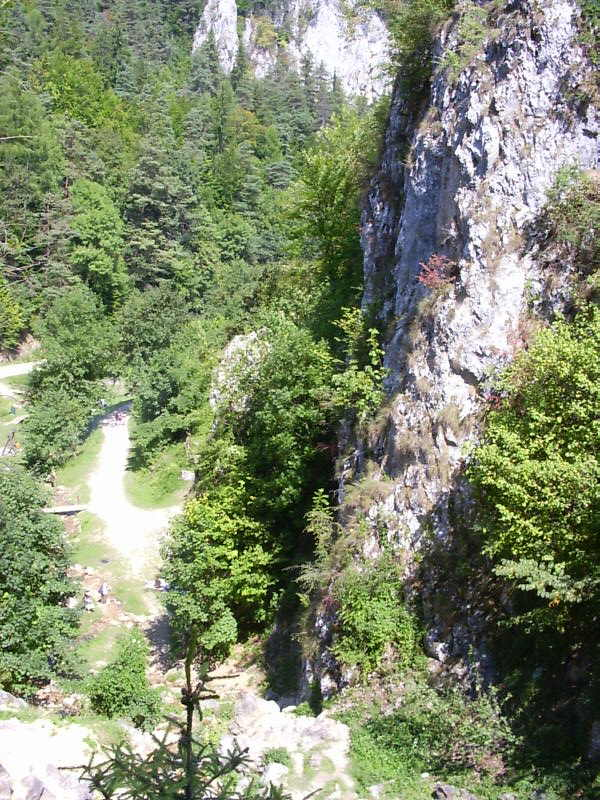
Solomon Cliffs (Pietrele lui Solomon) in Șcheii Brașovului

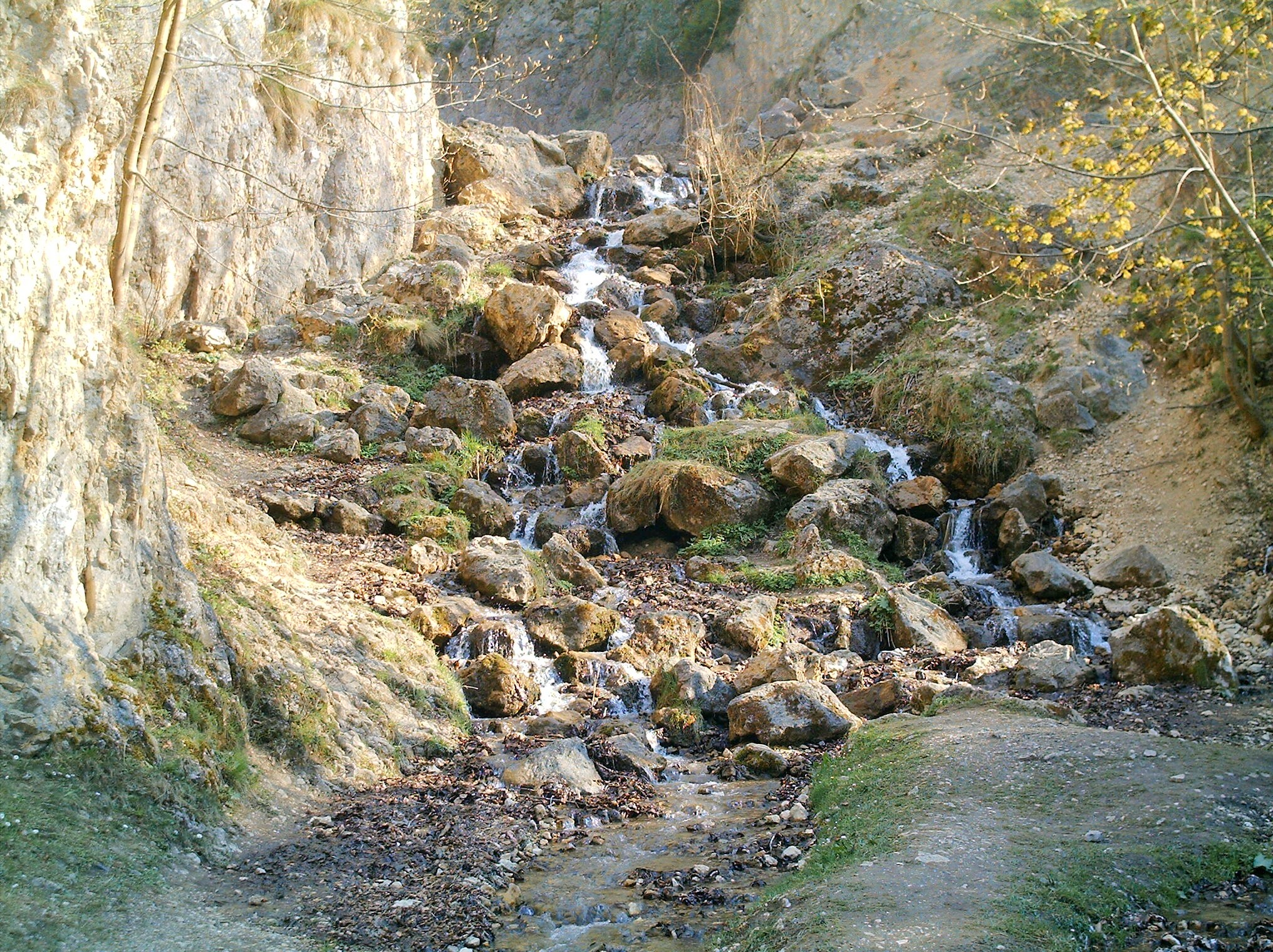
Waterfall at Solomon Cliffs
