= St. Nicholas Church, Brașov =

Orthodox church in Brașov

Saint Nicholas Church
- Biserica Sfântul Nicolae
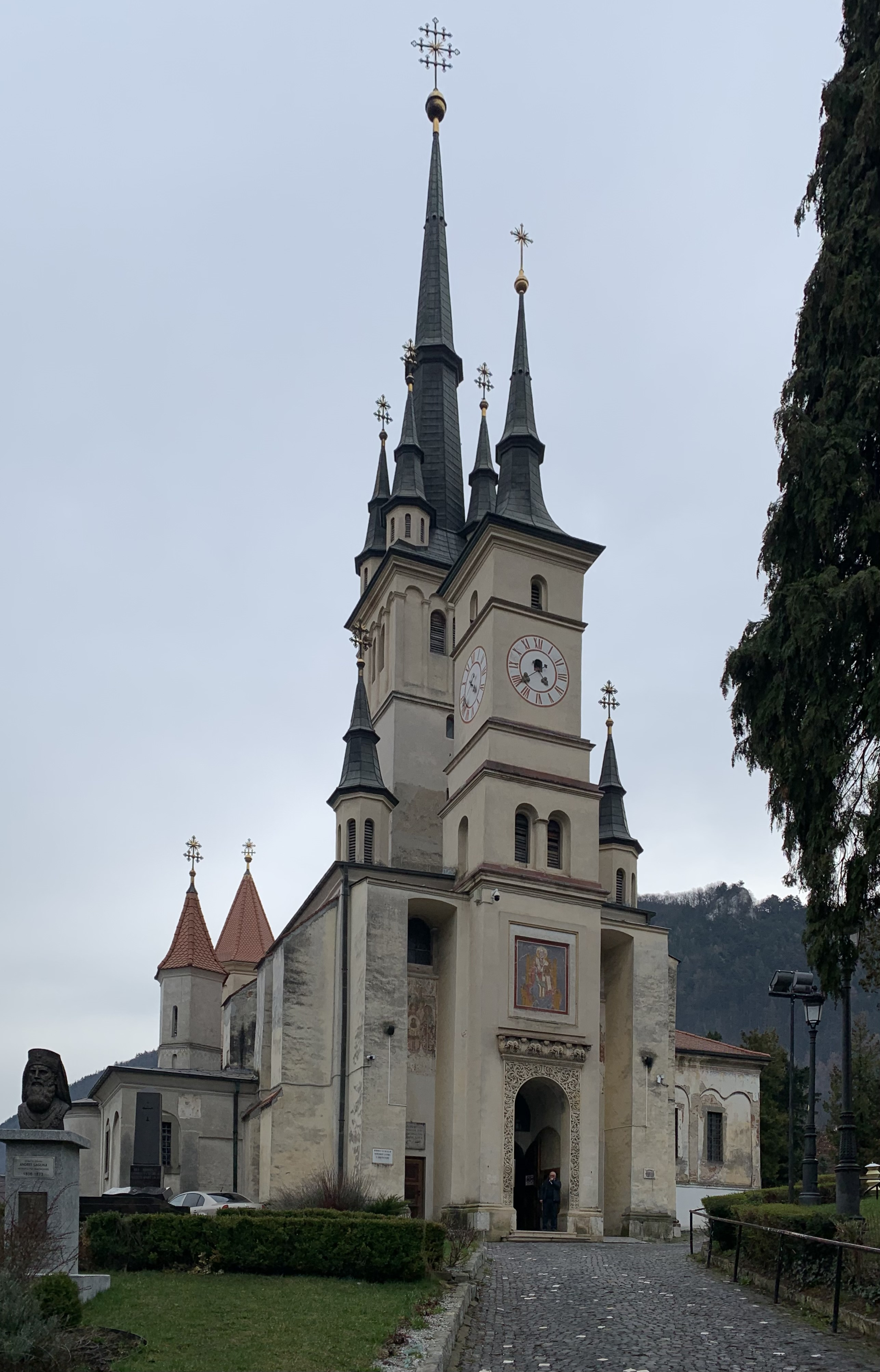
- Saint Nicholas Church
- 45°38′08″N 25°34′53″E
- Location: Șcheii Brașovului, Brașov, Brașov County
- Address: Piața Unirii 2, Brașov
- Country: Romania
- Denomination: Eastern Orthodox
- Website: protopopiatul-brasov.ro

History
- Status: Active
- Founder(s): Vlad Călugărul, Neagoe Basarab
- Dedication: Saint Nicholas

Architecture
- Functional status: Parish church
- Heritage designation: Monument istoric
- Architectural type: Gothic, Baroque
- Groundbreaking: 1495
- Completed: 1519

Administration
- Metropolis: Metropolis of Transylvania
- Archdiocese: Archdiocese of Sibiu

Monument istoric
- Official name: Biserica "Sf. Nicolae" cu paraclisele
- Designated: 2004
- Reference no.: BV-II-m-A-11589.01

Saint Nicholas Church (Romanian: Biserica Sfântul Nicolae) is a Romanian Orthodox church in Brașov, dominating the historic district of Șcheii Brașovului. One of the oldest Orthodox churches in the country and an important cultural center for the Romanians in Țara Bârsei, it is documented as being built on the site of a wooden cross dating to 1292. The first mention of the original wooden church dates to 1399, with the stone church built between 1495 and 1519. The church is a registered historic monument of Romania under the LMI Code BV-II-m-A-11589, as part of an ensemble of monuments which also includes the First Romanian School.

== History ==
The original church was established on the site of a cross with wood shingles which dated to 1292. It was first mentioned in a Papal bull issued in 1399 by Pope Boniface IX as a place of worship for the schismatics. In the 18th century, an aghiasmatar (holy water basin) was built in memory of this wooden church. Starting in 1495, the church was rebuilt in stone by the locals, with help from Voivode (Prince) Vlad Călugărul of Wallachia. The church had a rectangular nave and four-sided apse. More help was provided around 1513 by Neagoe Basarab, and the construction was finished in 1519 with the polygonal apse and three buttresses, larger than originally planned.

In 1584, Voivode Petru Cercel began construction of the church porch, the choir, and decorated the altar with icons. Works were continued by Moldavian Voivode Aron Vodă between 1595 and 1597, during which the bell tower was constructed and the interior of the church was painted. The pisanie of the church mounted above the door depicts the two Voivodes.

The tower chapel (dedicated to Saint John the Baptist) was built in 1651. The midnight office is held in this chapel. Between 1733 and 1734, the northern chapel (dedicated to the Annunciation) was completed with help from Protopope Radu Tempea II and Lady Ancuța, the daughter of Constantin Brâncoveanu. The southern chapel (dedicated to the Ascension of the Lord) was built between 1750 and 1752, with support from the local merchants. This chapel also houses an iconostasis with Brâncovenesc motifs. The clock tower was built in 1751 following a donation of 13,000 florins from Empress Elizabeth of Russia. Other important gifts were received from Michael the Brave, Petru Rareș, Gheorghe Ștefan, Constantin Brâncoveanu, as well as many parishioners over the centuries.

== Architecture ==
The church is built from stone and brick and has a rectangular nave with a circular apse on the east side. The pronaos and porch are located on the west side. The two chapels attached to the church are located on its north and south sides.

Saint Nicholas Church was initially built in the Gothic style; it was later redecorated with Baroque style architectural elements. The church presents two towers in the front: a larger, middle tower, the roof of which presents four turrets, and a smaller tower above the entrance flanked by two other turrets.

== Painting ==
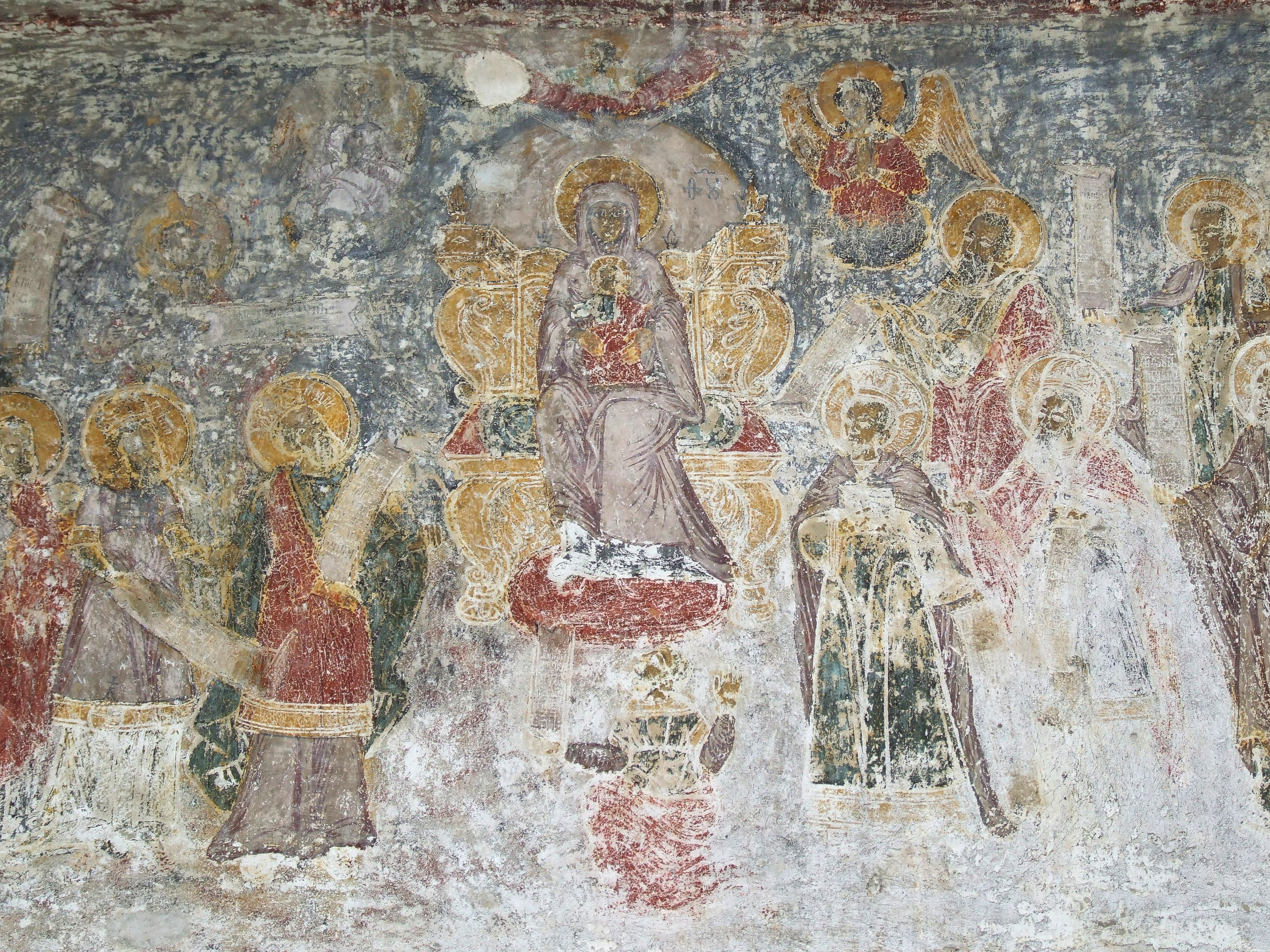
Fresco paintings

The current paintings of the church date to 1739 as attested by Protopope Radu Tempea II. The church was painted on both the inside and the outside. The interior has frescoes painted by the renowned muralist Mișu Popp together with Constantin Lecca in 1849. Costin Petrescu and the Fine Arts Academy students also added frescos to the inside of the church in the 20th century: the north-west wall features a mural with the entry of Michael the Brave in Brașov, the front wall features portraits of four founding Voivodes and an allegorical scene of the Coresian printing press, the south wall shows a scene of the coronation of King Ferdinand in Alba Iulia while the east wall has a festive moment with Metropolitan Andrei Șaguna.

The northern chapel was painted between 1735 and 1738 by Craiova painters Ranite Grigore, his brother Gheorghe and his son Ioan, and Mihaili who portrayed the Apocalypse of Saint John, the First Council of Nicaea, themes of Deesis and the Resurrection, and the mural "Wheel of the World" (which depicts the rotation of the Earth around the Sun performed by the saints). The southern chapel was painted in the 18th century by the painters Ioan and Iancu, with their apprentices Constantin and Irimia.

== Cultural activities ==
In 1495, the building of the First Romanian School was constructed under the auspices of the church and the first books in Romanian were published there by deacon Coresi in the 16th century. At the same time, a school of copyists was established to translate important religious and cultural books into Romanian. In the 19th century, the church supported the Junii Brașoveni Society and helped fund the Romanian Gymnasium of Brașov in 1851. The church also established numerous foundations to support local public life such as the first local public library.

The archive of the church retains as many as 2,800 old books and manuscripts dating as far back as the 15th century.

== Historic district ==
Located within the churchyard walls there are:

- St. Nicholas Cemetery, where Ioan Meșotă, Aurel Popovici, Vasile Saftu, and Nicolae Titulescu are buried.
- Statue of Coresi.

Adjacent in the Șchei historic district there is:

- The First Romanian School, constructed in 1495, started Romanian-language classes in 1583.

== Gallery ==
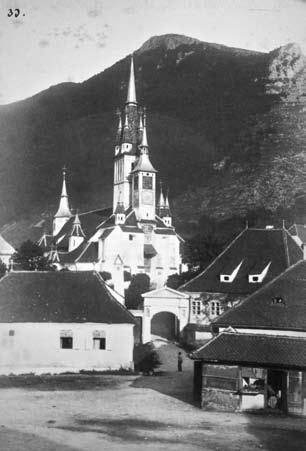
The Saint Nicholas Church c. 1885

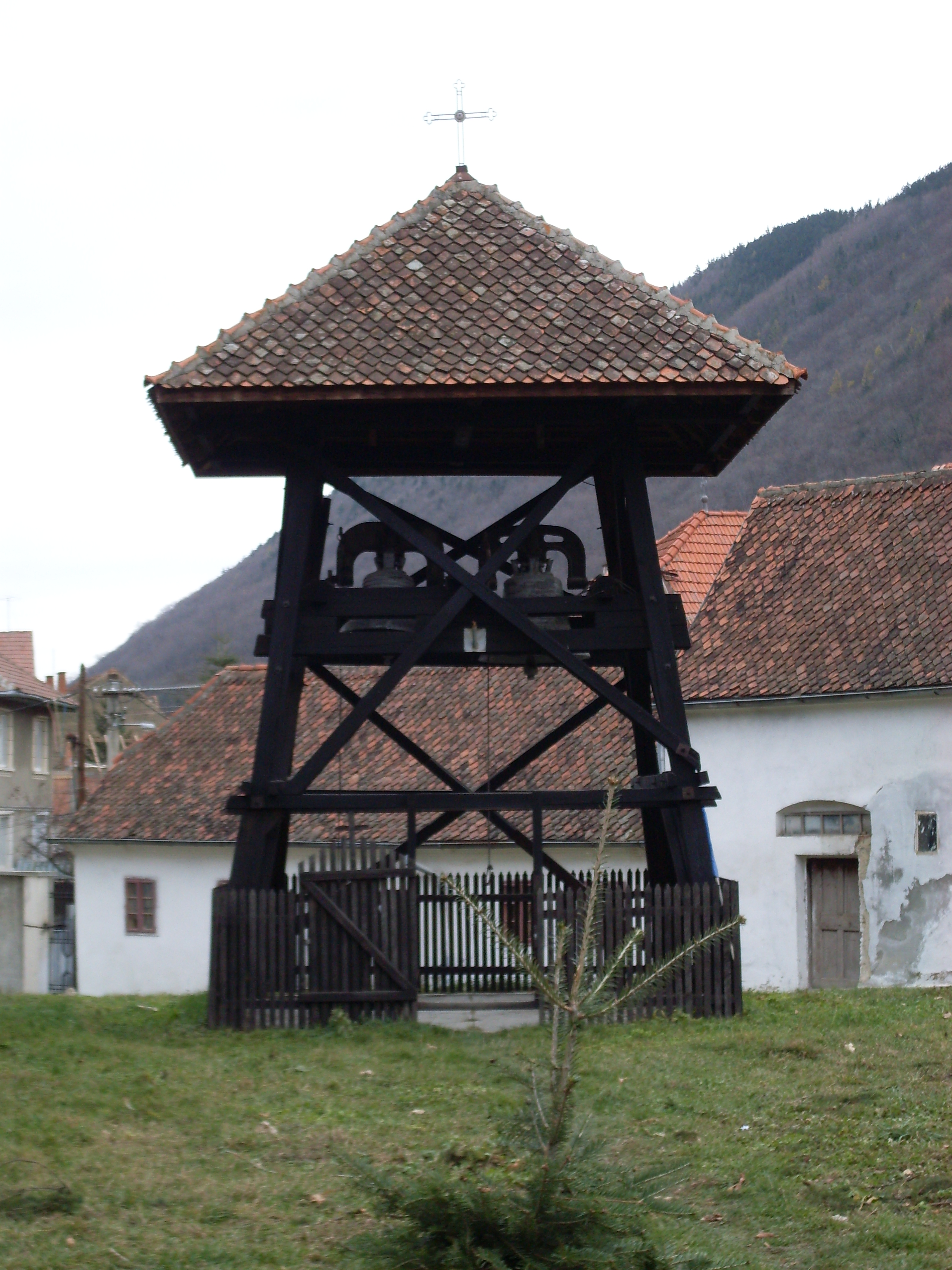
The belfry of the church

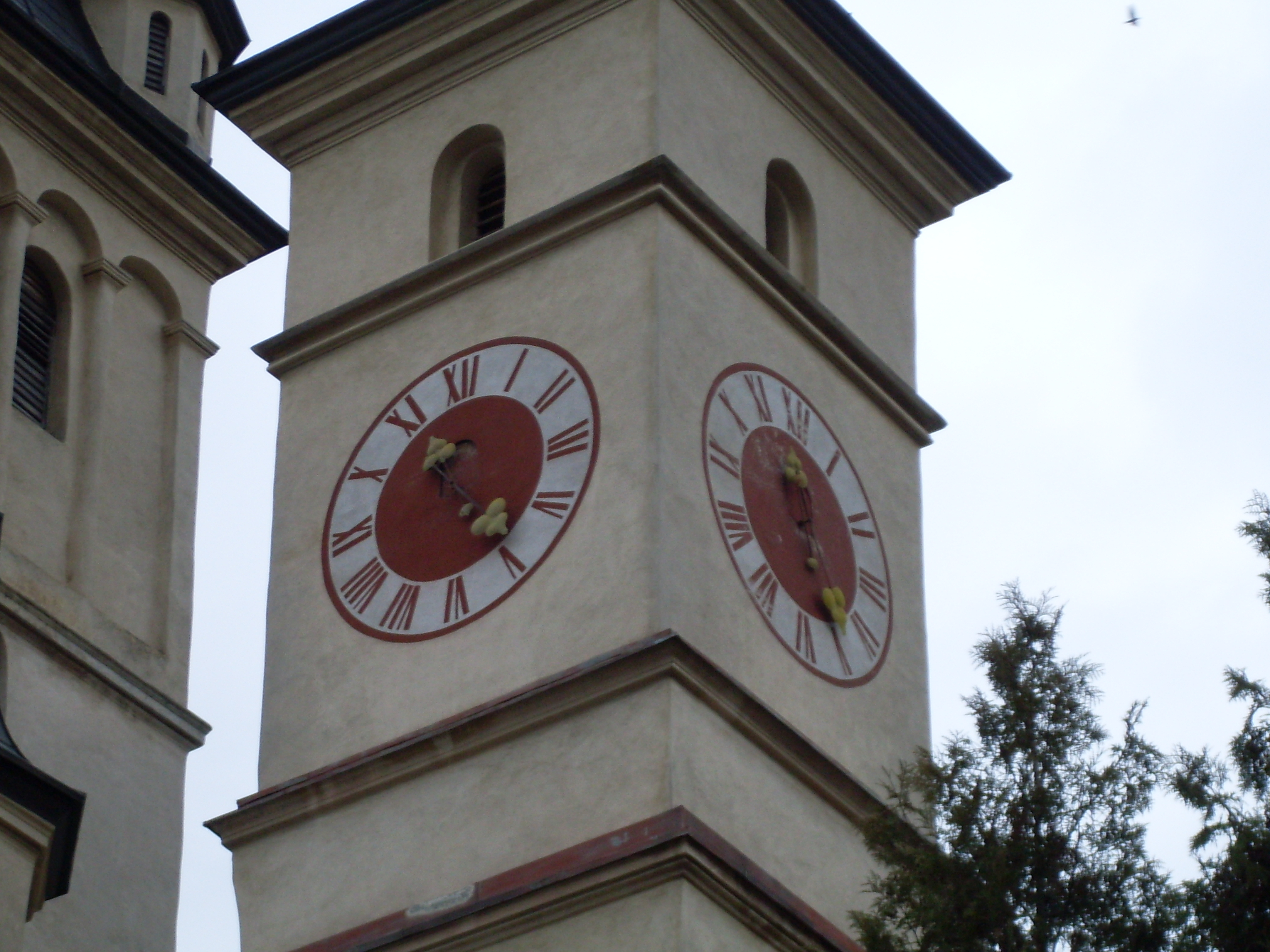
The clock of the church in 2008

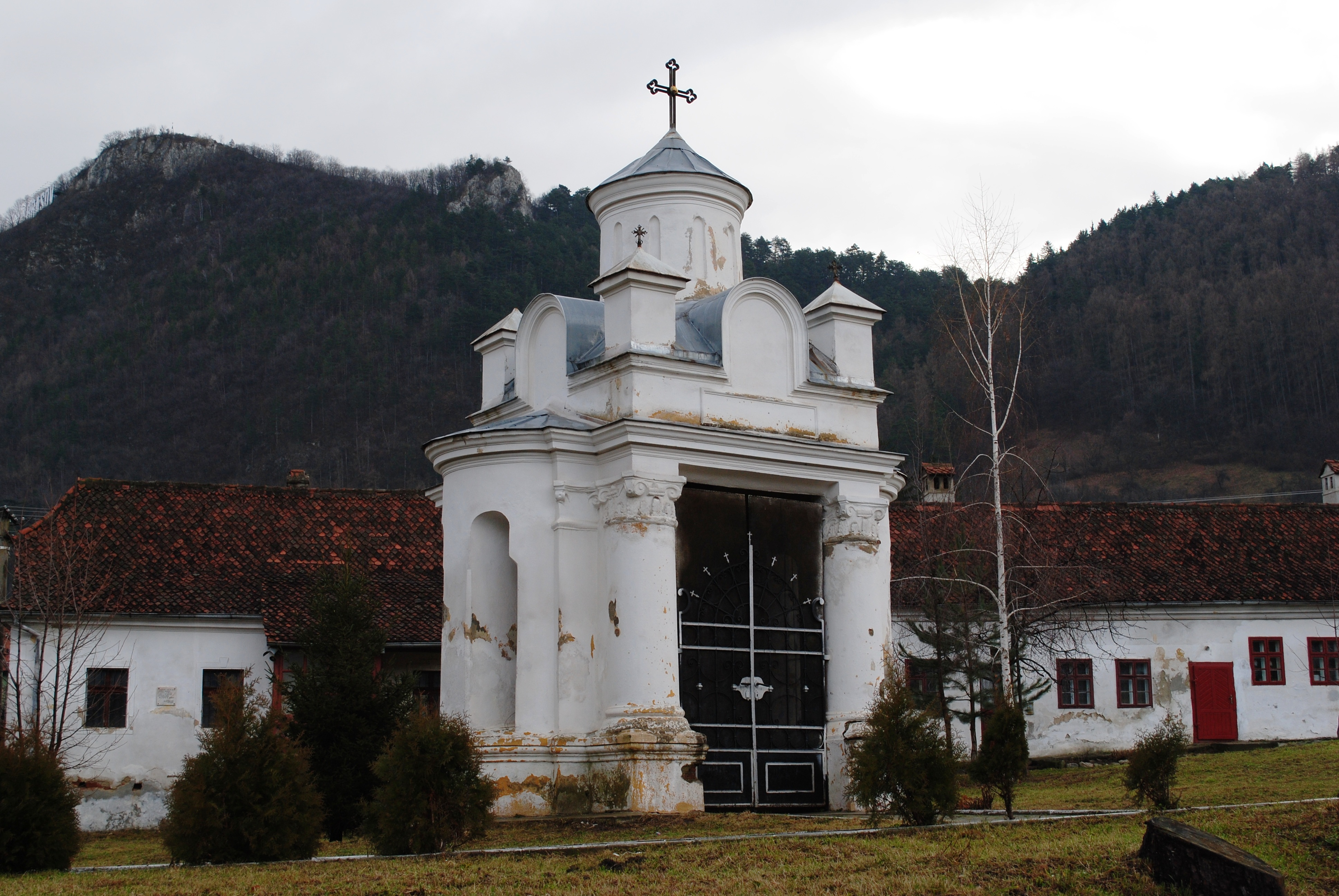
The aghiasmatar

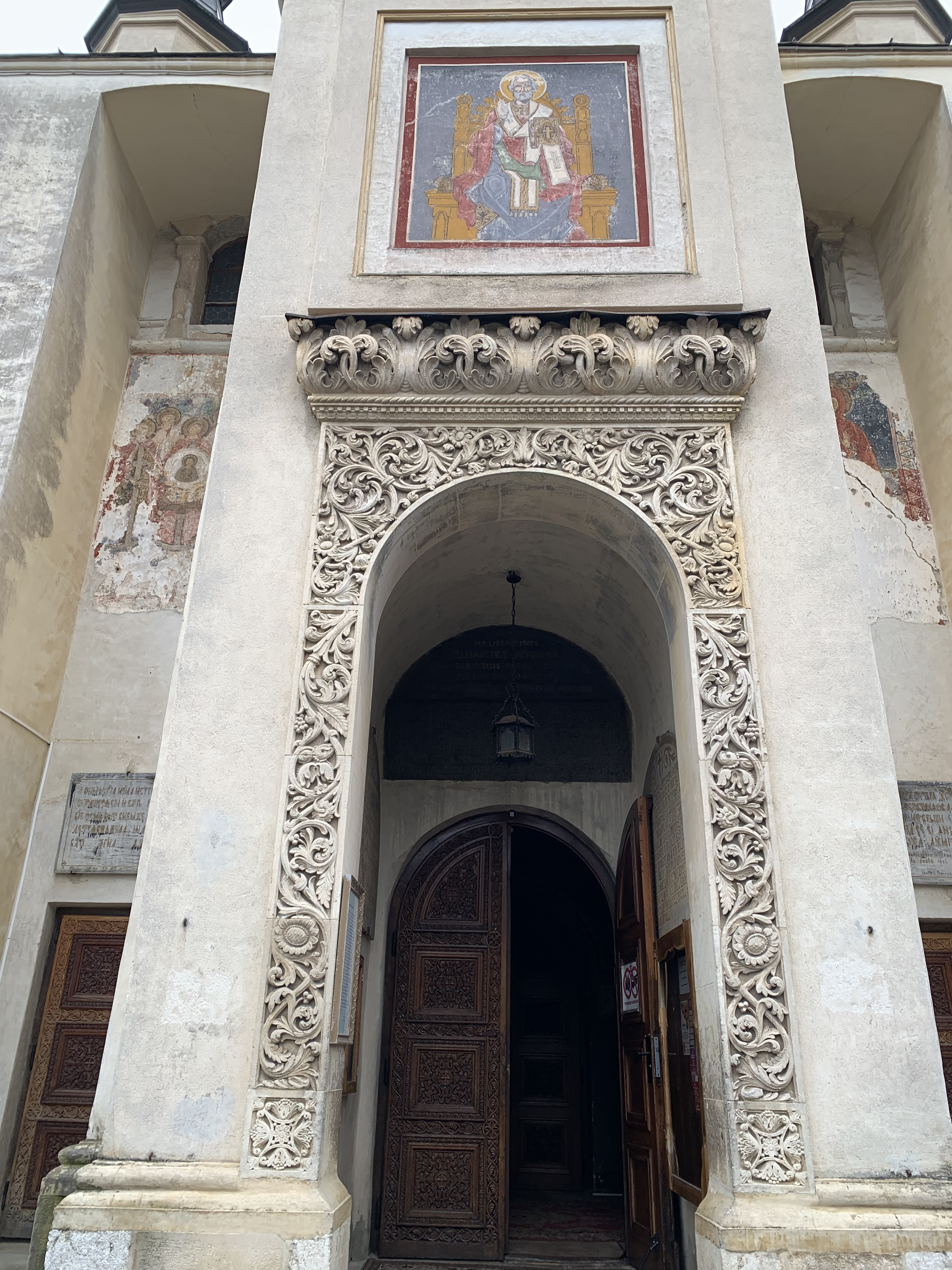
The entrance of the church

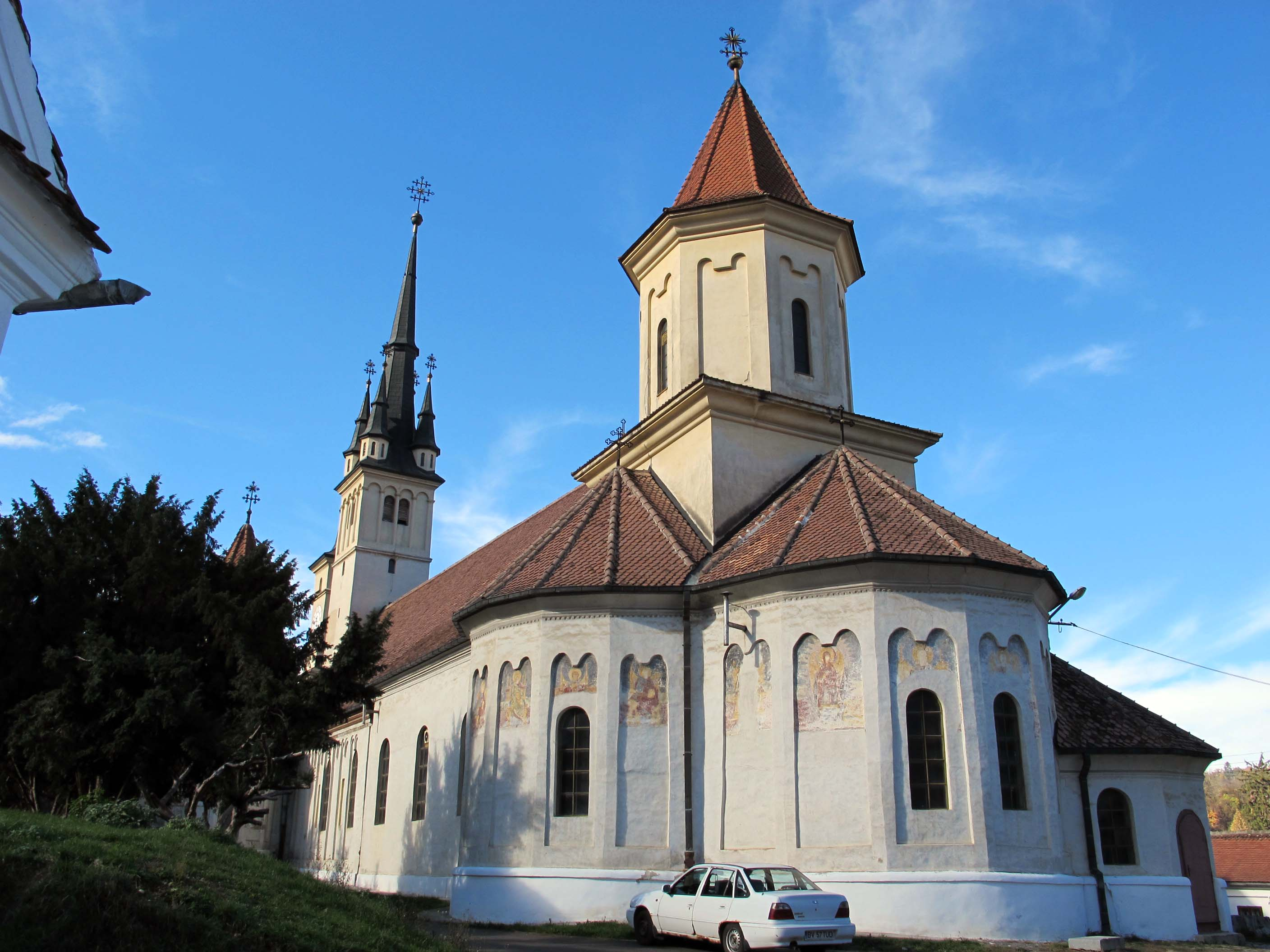
The back of the church

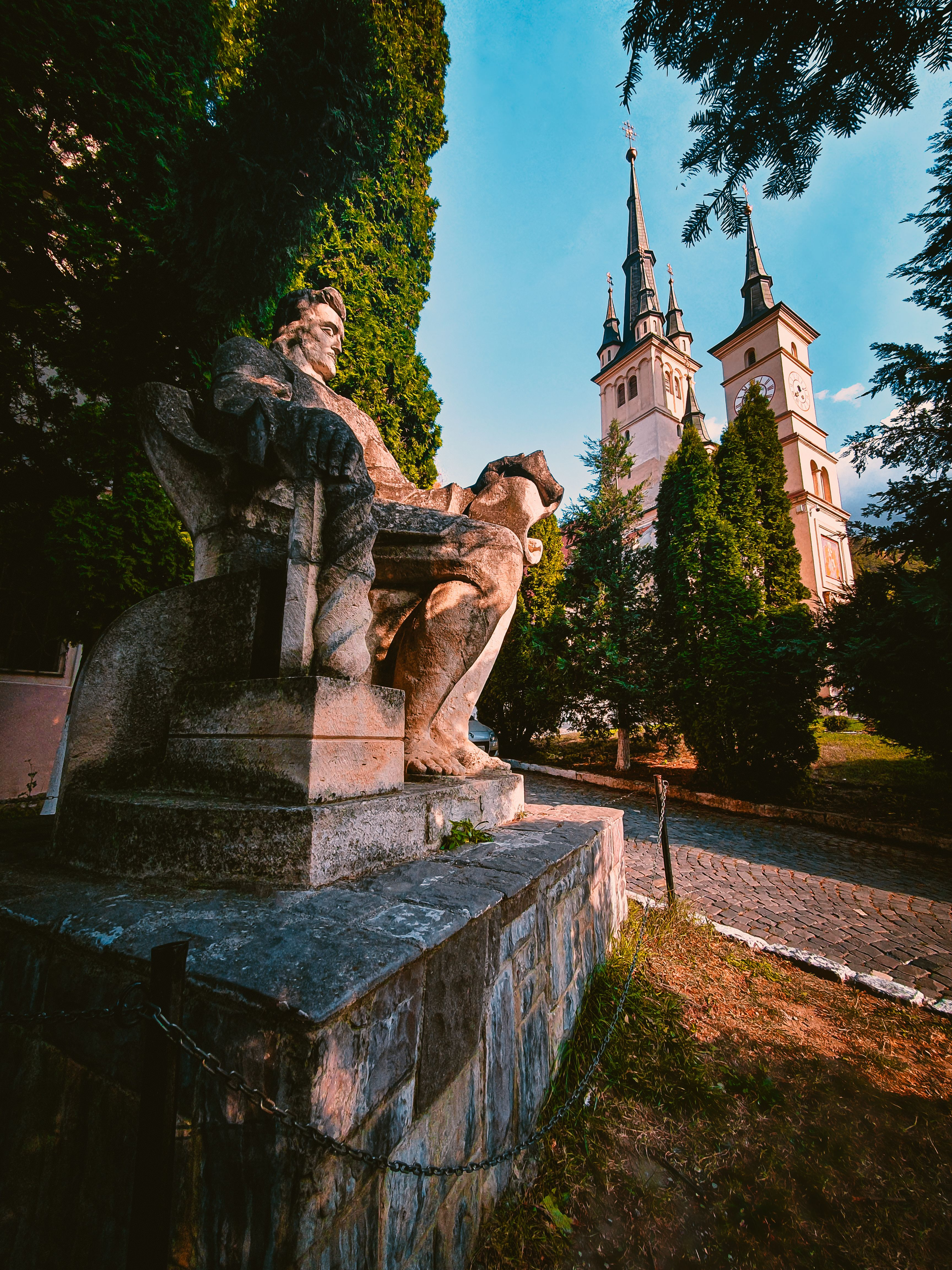
View of the church from the statue of deacon Coresi

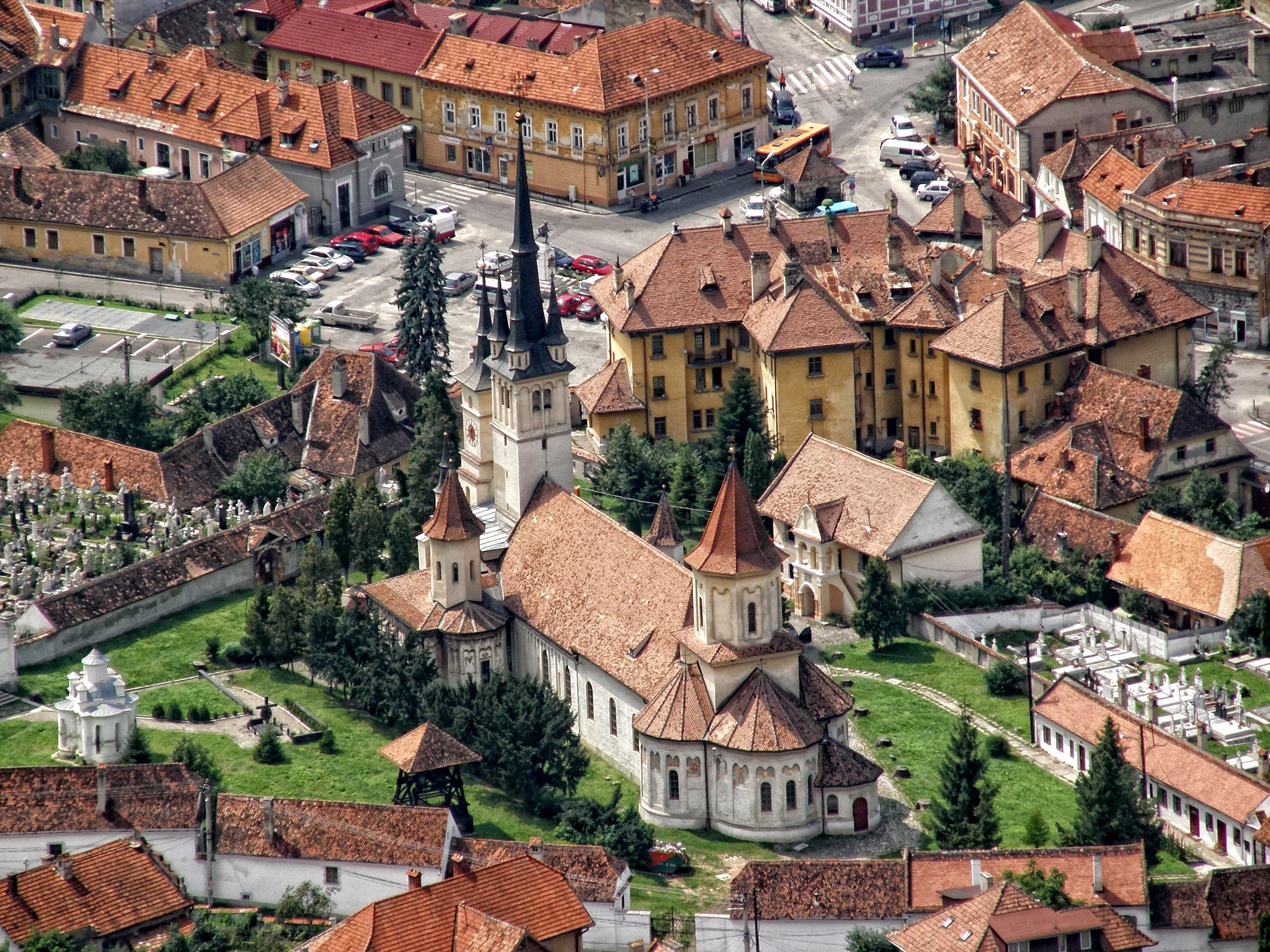
Aerial view of the church

== Bibliography ==
- Pușcariu, Sextil (1977). Brașovul de altădată (in Romanian). Cluj-Napoca: Editura Dacia. OCLC 3446164.
- Șuluțiu, Octav (1937). Brașov (in Romanian). Bucharest: Fundația pentru Literatură și Artă "Regele Carol II".
