= First Romanian School =

Heritage site in Braşov County, Romania

Coordinates: 45.635842°N 25.581191°E

First Romanian School Romanian: Prima școală românească
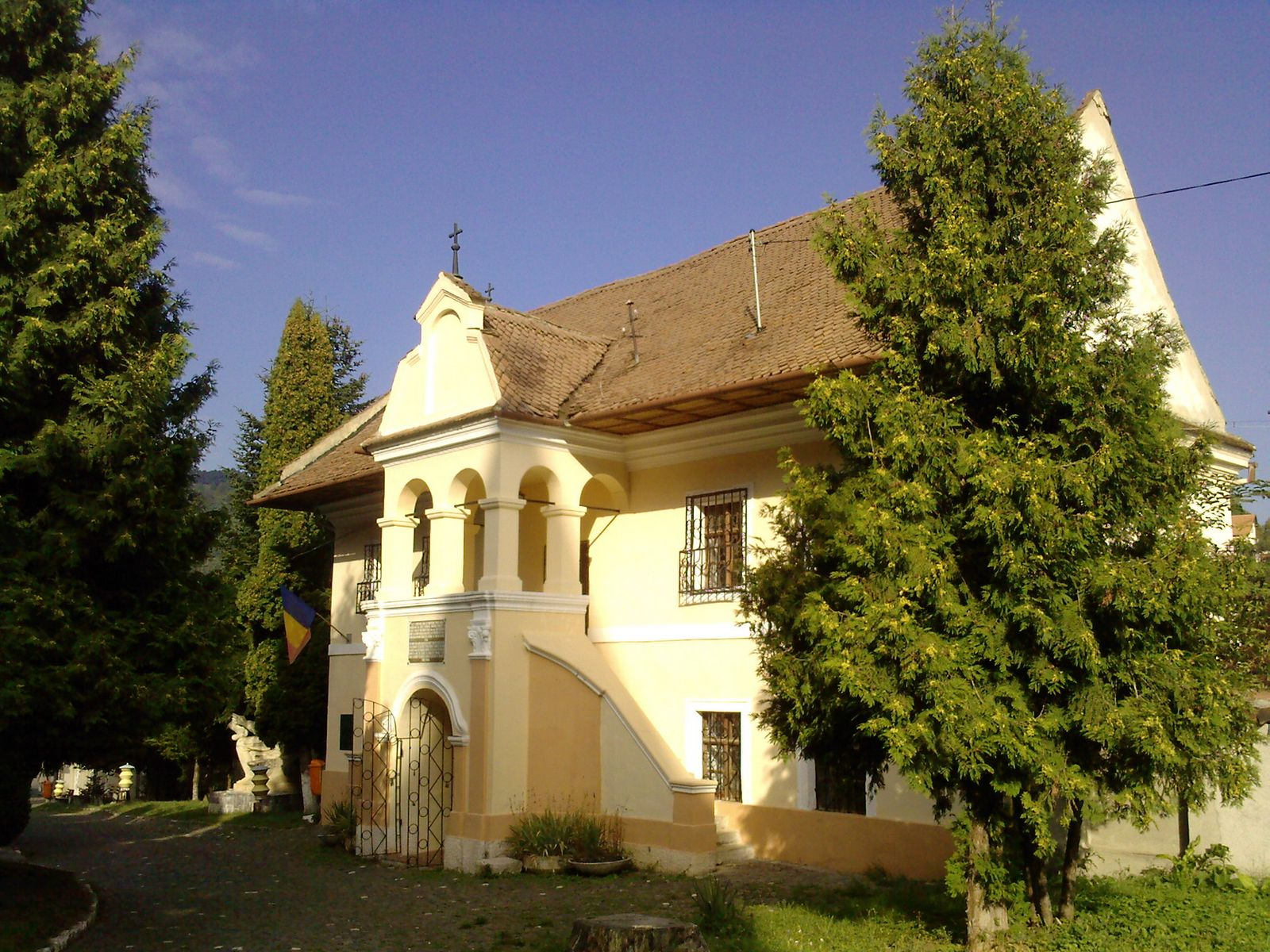

Location
- Șcheii Brașovului; Romania

Information
- Established: Before the 15th century
- Closed: 1850
- Capacity: 110
- Language: Church Slavonic (founding-1583); Romanian (1583-1850)

The First Romanian School (Romanian: Prima școală românească) is located on the grounds of the 15th-century St. Nicholas Church, itself located in the historic district of Șcheii Brașovului, in what is now Brașov, Romania. This is the first school on the territory of present-day Romania where Romanian language was used in teaching (in 1583; up to then, Romanians used Church Slavonic language in education).

== History ==
The building was erected in 1495, but according to researcher Vasile Oltean, the school had started to function before the 15th century. The first Romanian-language classes were held in 1583. It was rebuilt in 1597.

The background of the students was varied and, being the only Romanian school in this region of Transylvania, people came from far and wide. Each village paid for one student to attend the school, in order to learn to teach upon returning and share their education. Over time, a total of 1,730 students attended the school; however there were at most 110 at any given time.

== As a museum ==
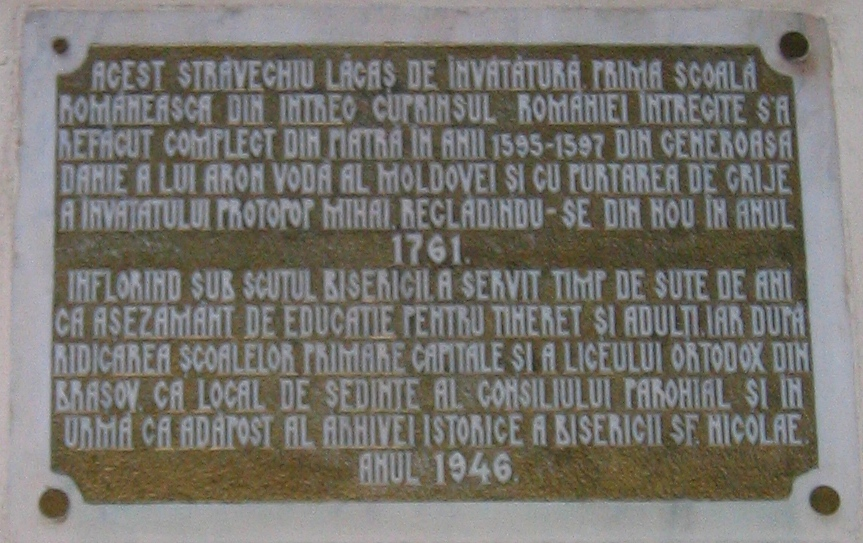
Plaque above the school entrance

The school remained in use until 1850, when Andrei Șaguna College was opened. The collections of archaic and original items were gathered starting in 1933 and were first organized in a museum in 1964. It houses a variety of early Slavic and Romanian books, the first Romanian Bible, and what can be loosely described as the first school magazine. The library contains six thousand books which were used in the school.

The museum also contains the first Romanian printing press. Only 39 books were made by this press, which is hardly surprising given the labour required, however the work it did produce included plenty more firsts. The first Romanian letter in Latin was produced by the press, the first Romanian schoolbook and the first Bible, which was printed on goatskin and had a cover weighing a hefty 7 kilograms (15 pounds).

The plaque above the school entrance reads: "This ancient place of learning, the first Romanian school in all of Greater Romania, was completely rebuilt in stone in the years 1595–1597 through the generous gift of Prince Aron of Moldavia and through the care for learning of the Archpriest Mihai, being built anew in the year 1761. Flowering under the shield of the Church, it served for hundreds of years as a centre of education for youth and adults. And after the most important primary schools and the Orthodox high school of Brașov were built, [it functioned] as a meeting place for the parish council and later sheltered the historic archives of St. Nicholas Church. Year 1946."
