= Moldovans =

Ethnic group native to Eastern Europe

moldoveni
- Map of the Moldovan diaspora

Total population
- c. 2.9 million

Regions with significant populations
- Moldova 2,023,069 (including 135,957 in Transnistria)
- Other countries
- Romania: 285,000
- Ukraine: 258,619
- Italy: 188,923
- Germany: 100,000–139,000
- Russia: 77,509
- Poland: 37,338
- France: 26,300–160,000
- Spain: 17,426
- Kazakhstan: 14,245
- Portugal: 13,586
- Turkey: 13,472
- Greece: 9,920
- Canada: 8,050
- United States: 7,859
- Czech Republic: 5,260
- Belarus: 3,465
- United Kingdom: 3,417
- Latvia: 2,284

Languages
- Romanian (also referred to as "Moldovan")

Religion
- Orthodox Christianity

Related ethnic groups
- Romanians

Moldovans, sometimes referred to as Moldavians (Romanian: moldoveni, Moldovan Cyrillic: молдовень, pronounced [moldoˈvenʲ]), are an ethnic group native to Moldova, who mostly speak the Romanian language, also referred to locally as Moldovan. Moldovans form significant communities in Romania, Italy, Ukraine and Russia.

There is an ongoing controversy in Moldova over whether Moldovans constitute an ethnic group separate from Romanians or not. 77.18% and 7.9% of the Moldovan population declared Moldovan and Romanian ethnicity respectively in the 2024 Moldovan census, with 49.2% declaring their mother language to be Moldovan and 31.3% declaring it to be Romanian. According to opinion polls, around one third of Moldova's population supports unification with Romania.

The term "Moldavian" can also be used to refer to the inhabitants of the territory of the historical Principality of Moldavia, currently divided among Romania (47.5%), Moldova (30.5%) and Ukraine (22%). In Romania, natives of Western Moldavia identifying with the term declare Romanian ethnicity, while the natives of the Republic of Moldova are usually called "Bessarabians" (Romanian: basarabeni).

== History ==
The Principality of Moldavia in the 15th century

According to Miron Costin, a prominent chronicler from 17th-century Moldavia, the inhabitants of the Principality of Moldavia spoke Latin and called themselves "Moldavians", but also "Romans" (with the local form "român/râmlean") which, he notes, comes from "romanus". Also, the Slavic neighbours called Moldovans "Vlachs" or "Volokhs", a term also used to refer to all native Romance speakers from Eastern Europe and the Balkan Peninsula.

In 1812, the Russian Empire received the eastern half of Moldavia from the Ottoman Empire and named it Bessarabia. As the ethnonym "Romanian" was gaining more and more popularity throughout the remaining territory of Moldavia and Bukovina during the 19th century, its dissemination in Bessarabia, a more backward and rural province of the Russian Empire at the time, was welcomed mostly by the Romanian-oriented intellectuals, while the majority of the rural population continued to use the old self-identification "Moldovans".

Some authors observe that the Russian officials also initially preferred to refer to the native inhabitants of Bessarabia as "Romanians" (or "Volochi"), but after the 1859 unification of Moldavia and Wallachia they gradually began using the term "Moldavians" for them, to justify the idea of Russifiers and Pan-Slavists to create an identity different from that of the Romanians of Western Moldavia. Historian van Meurs however indicates that some Russian official documents and scholarly studies in the 19th century actually continued to use both "Romanians" and "Moldavians" when referring to the local population, noting that the Russian policy which restricted the use of the Romanian language in Bessarabia was rather part of the general tendency of Russification and of promotion of a tsarist nationality policy as such.

Van Meurs concludes that before the October Revolution the inhabitants of Bessarabia probably considered themselves "Moldavians" in a "natural, primarily local-territorial sense", and there had been no consistent government-sponsored effort to influence the local nation-building process by promoting a Moldavian identity. Likewise, historian Charles King notes that the Moldovan peasant's view of his own national identity was not the product of Russian assimilationist policies but had instead remained virtually frozen since 1812. The Romanian researcher Irina Livezeanu further notes that the Russification policies did not greatly affect the identity of the Moldavians, as their overwhelming majority were illiterate peasants.

Until the 1920s, Romanian historians generally considered Moldovans as a subgroup of the Romanian ethnos. After 1924, within the newly created Moldavian Autonomous Soviet Socialist Republic, Soviet authorities supported the creation of the Moldovan language standards allegedly in order to prove that Moldovans form a separate ethnic group.

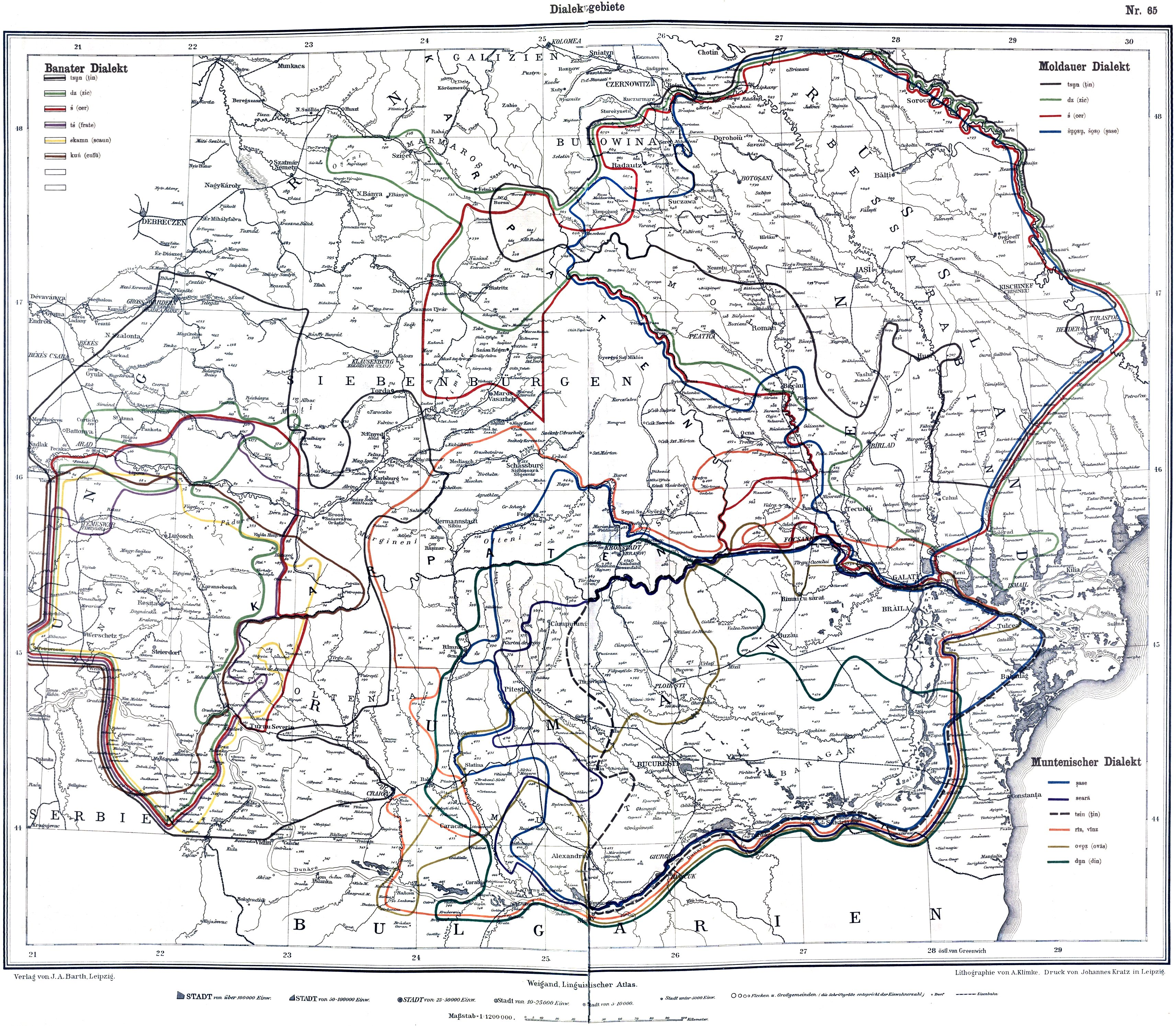
A 1908 map of Romanian dialects (Banat, Moldovan, Muntenian) by Gustav Weigand

In the past, the terms "Moldovan" or "Moldavian" have been used to refer to the population of the historical Principality of Moldavia. However, for the inhabitants of Bessarabia living under the Russian rule, the term gained an ethnic connotation by the beginning of the 20th century: in May 1917, at a congress of Bessarabian teachers, a dispute arose over the identification of the native population; a group protested against being called "Romanians", affirming they were "Moldovans", while another group, led by poet Alexei Mateevici, supported the view that the Moldovans are also Romanians.

In March 1918, Bessarabia (the Moldovan Democratic Republic) joined the Kingdom of Romania, following a vote of Sfatul Țării. The circumstances surrounding the vote were themselves complex, since, at the request of the Sfatul Țării, Romanian troops were present in Bessarabia, as it was facing external threats and anarchy within.

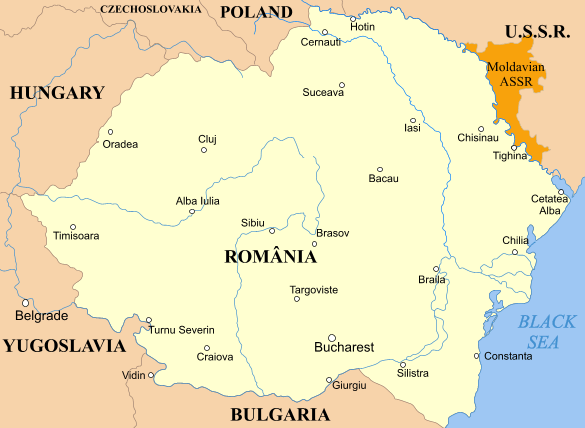
Map depicting the borders of the Kingdom of Romania (1918–1940) and the M.A.S.S.R. to the east

By the time of the union, the peasants of Bessarabia, who constituted the majority of Romanian speakers in the region, clung to a Moldavian identity and did not undergo the same nation-building as the ones in Romania. Moreover, during the interwar, peasants in all regions of historical Moldavia (Bessarabia, Bukovina and Western Moldavia) where more likely to identify themselves as Moldavians than city-dwellers. Several researchers who visited the area around World War I, including the Romanian historian Ion Nistor and French geographer Emmanuel de Martonne testified that most Bessarabian peasants called themselves Moldavians. On the other hand, the small Moldavian urban elite was Russified to a large degree. Pan-Romanian nationalism was "almost wholly" imported into the region around World War I by propagandists from Transylvania, Bukovina and the Old Kingdom.

The Romanian state promoted a common identity for all its inhabitants. Owing partly to its relative underdevelopment compared to other regions of Greater Romania, as well as to the low competence and corruption of the new Romanian administration in this province, the integration process of Bessarabia in the unified Romanian state was less successful than in other regions and was soon to be disrupted by the Soviet occupation.

In 1940, during World War II, Romania agreed to an ultimatum and returned the region to the Soviet Union, which organized it into the Moldavian SSR. The Soviets began a campaign to return the Moldovan identity overt that of the rest of Romanian speakers, taking advantage of the incomplete integration of Bessarabia into the interwar Romania (see also Moldovenism). The official Soviet policy also stated that Romanian and Moldovan were two different languages and, to emphasize this distinction, Moldovan had to be written in a new Cyrillic alphabet (the Moldovan Cyrillic alphabet) based on the Russian Cyrillic, rather than the older Romanian Cyrillic that ceased to be used in the 19th century in the Romanian Old Kingdom and in 1917 in Bessarabia.

== Identity politics in the Republic of Moldova ==
A survey carried out in the Republic of Moldova in 1992 showed that 87% of the Moldovan (later renamed Romanian) speakers identified themselves as "Moldovans", rather than "Romanians".

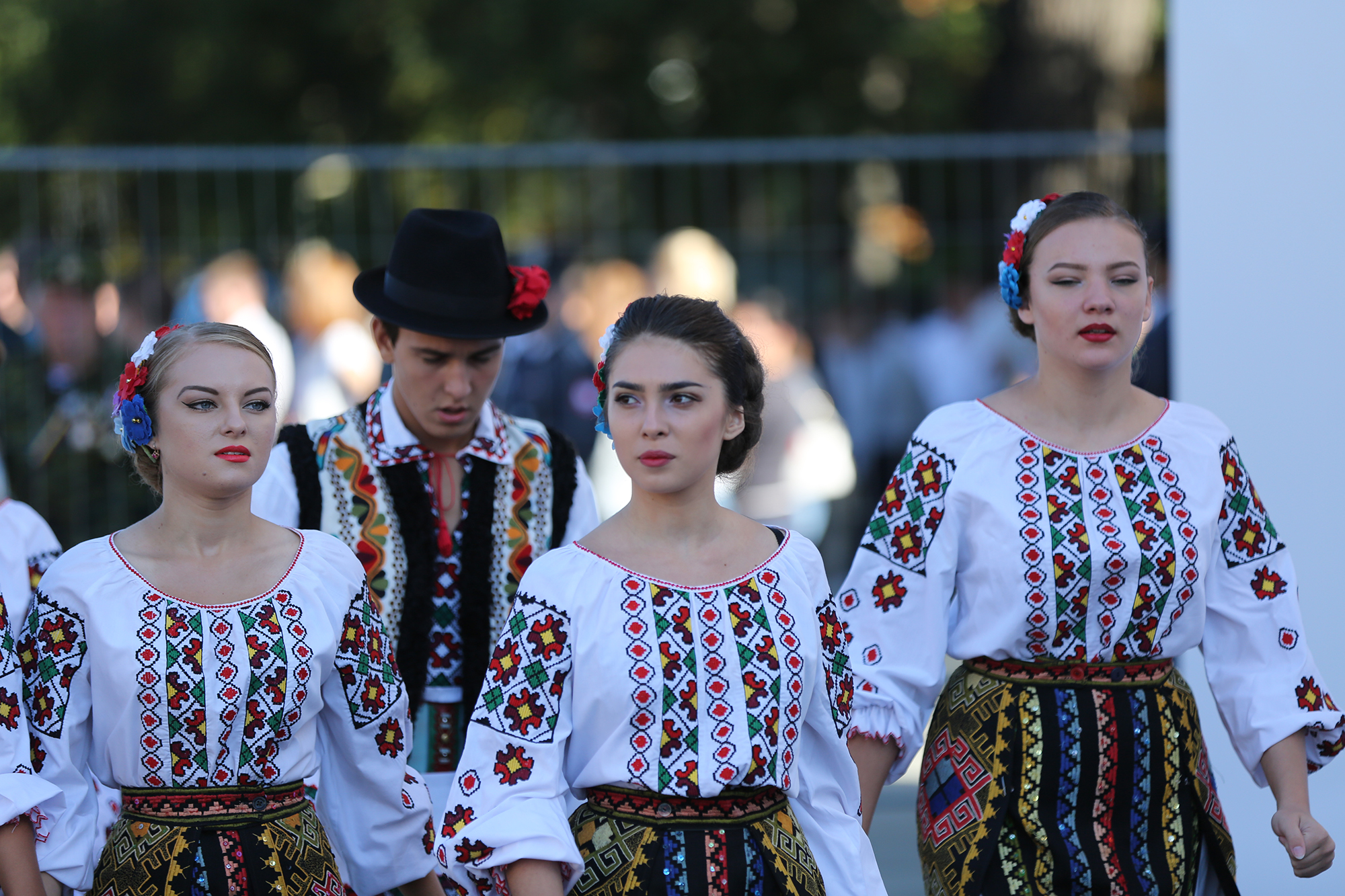
Moldovans wearing traditional costumes

According to a study conducted in the Republic of Moldova in May 1998, when the self-declared Moldovans were asked to characterize the relationship of the Romanian and Moldovan identities, 55% considered them somewhat different, 26% very different and less than 5% identical.

A poll conducted in the Republic of Moldova by IMAS-Inc Chișinău in October 2009 presented a more detailed picture. The respondents were asked to rate the relationship between the Romanian and Moldovan identities on a scale between 1 (entirely the same) to 5 (completely different). The poll showed that 26% of the entire sample, which included all ethnic groups, claimed the two identities were the same or very similar, whereas 47% claimed they were different or entirely different.

The results varied significantly among different categories of subjects. For instance, while 33% of the young respondents (ages from 18 to 29 years) chose the same or very similar and 44% different or very different, among the senior respondents (aged over 60 years) the corresponding figures were 18.5% and 53%. The proportion of those who chose the same or very similar identity was higher than the average among the native speakers of Romanian/Moldovan (30%), among the urban dwellers (30%), among those with higher education (36%), and among the residents of the capital city (42%).

According to a 2020 OSCE-sponsored study, among the population of Moldova, 20% of ethnic Moldovans secondarily identified as Romanians, while 68% of ethnic Romanians secondarily identified as Moldovans. When asked about their mother tongue, among ethnic Moldovans 69% identified it as Moldovan, 34% as Romanian, and 7% as Russian (multiple answers were allowed). The study indicated ethnic Moldovans are highly endogamous, with 87% reporting a spouse of the same ethnic groups; in contrast, 50% of the Romanians indicated a Moldovan spouse. While 91% of the ethnic Moldovans reported having Moldavian parents of either sex, among ethnic Romanians 52% indicated having a Moldovan mother (as opposed to 45% having a Romanian one), while 49% indicated having a Moldovan father (as opposed to 50% having a Romanian one).

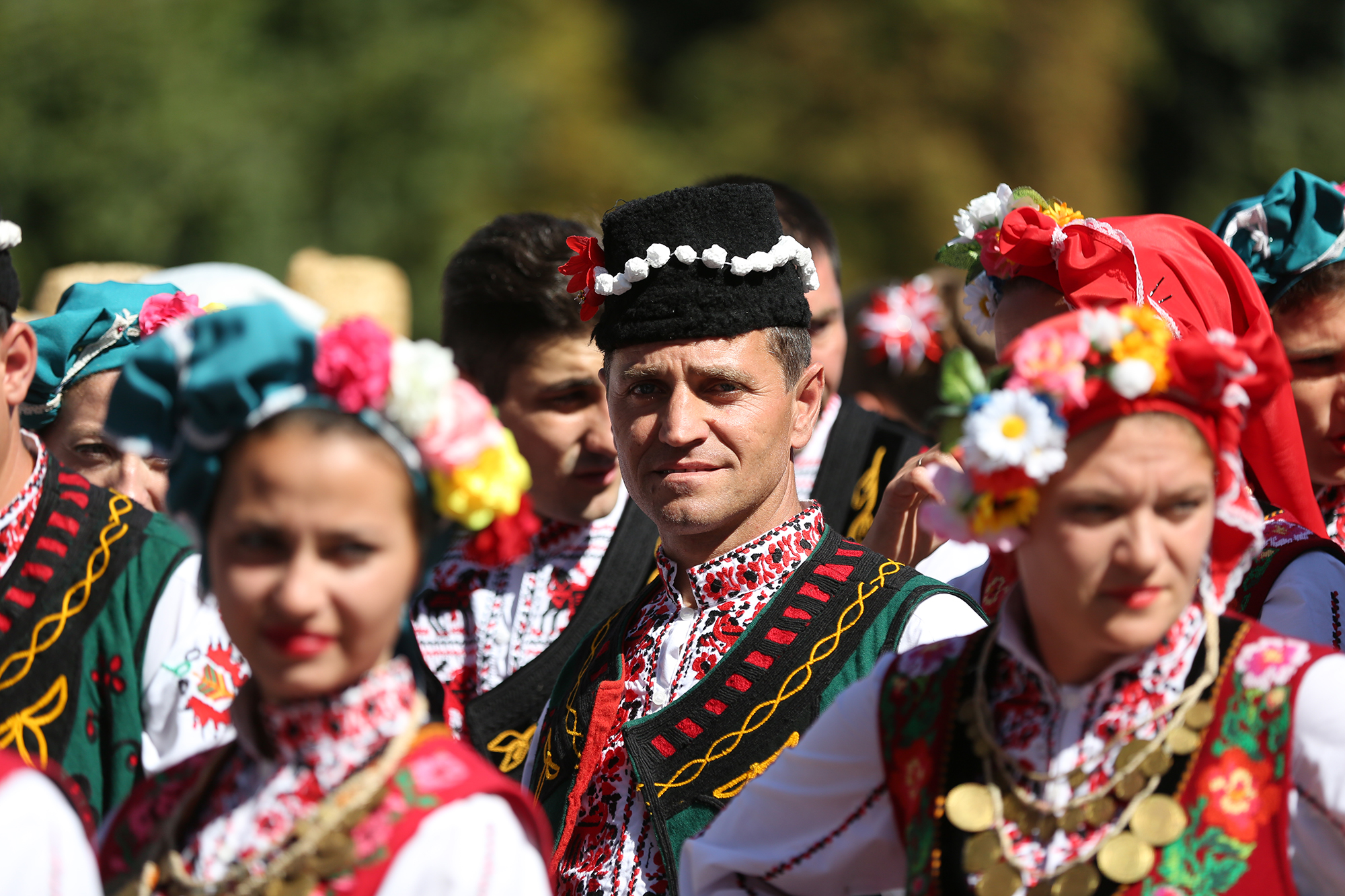
People wearing traditional Moldovan costumes in Chișinău

Also the major Moldovan political forces have diverging opinions regarding the identity of Moldovans. This contradiction is reflected in their stance towards the national history that should be taught in schools. Governing forces such as the Liberal Party, Liberal Democratic Party, and Our Moldova Alliance support the teaching of the history of Romanians. Others, such as the Democratic Party and the Party of Communists support the history of the Republic of Moldova.

The diverging opinions are also reflected in the official state documents issued in successive legislatures. The Declaration of Independence of 1991 calls the official language "Romanian", and the first anthem adopted by the independent Republic of Moldova was "Deşteaptă-te, române" ("Awaken thee, Romanian!"), the same as the anthem of Romania.

Mirroring different political configurations of the later Moldovan Parliament, the Constitution of Moldova (1994) calls the official language "Moldovan", while the "Concept of the National Policy of the Republic of Moldova" (2003) adopted by the Communist-dominated Parliament distinguishes explicitly Moldovans and Romanians as ethnic groups, and so does the census of 2004.

On 5 December 2013, the Constitutional Court of the Republic of Moldova ruled that the Romanian language is the official language of this country, in agreement with the Declaration of Independence of 1991.

=== Intellectuals of Bessarabia and the Romanian identity ===
A significant number of intellectuals from Bessarabia considered themselves part of the Romanian nation in the passing of time. Amongst these prominent figures, there are the following ones:

- Alexei Mateevici (1888–1917), author of the Moldovan national anthem Limba noastră said at a congress of Bessarabian teachers in 1917: "Yes, we are Moldovans, sons of the old Moldavia, but we belong to the large body of the Romanian nation, that lives in Romania, Bukovina and Transylvania. Our brothers from Bukovina, Transylvania and Macedonia don't call themselves after the places they live in, but call themselves Romanians. That is what we should do as well!".
- Emanoil Catelli (1883–1943), a politician of the Moldavian Democratic Republic, and later of Romania, said in 1917: "The Moldovans who remained silent for 106 years, should speak louder today [...] because they are Romanians, and only the Russians demoted them to the role of 'Moldovans' ".
- Maria Cebotari (1910–1949), one of the most famous sopranos born in Bessarabia said: "Never and in no circumstance has it crossed my mind to say that I am anything else than a Romanian from Bessarabia, or, simply, a Romanian".
- Grigore Vieru (1935–2009), prominent Moldovan poet, a staunch supporter of Pan-Romanianism, wrote: "Moldovans hurt me too/Inhumanly/But I'm happy that Romanianness/Still lives in them" (Bessarabia with Sorrow).
- Eugen Doga (born 1937), a famous Moldovan composer, explained in an interview his visit to Alba-Iulia, Romania: "This is the capital of the union, a real Mecca [...]. I think people come here not forced, but freely, for a return to their brothers".
- Gheorghe Duca (born 1952), president of the Moldovan Academy of Sciences said: "Just like the whole Romanian nation, that Grigore Vieru praised, I cannot believe the Poet left home forever".
- Constantin Tănase (born 1949), director of the Moldovan newspaper Timpul de dimineață, one of the most influential opinion leaders from Moldova stated: "The academia, the political and cultural elite has to show that Romanianness in the Republic of Moldova is not an extremist whim, but a reality and a condition of the existence of this state".

The resolution of the "Association of Historians from the Republic of Moldova" (AIRM) from 28 October 2009 in favor of teaching the history of Romanians in Moldovan schools reads "The people of the Moldovan SSR were subjected to the Communist ideology, with the aim of replacing the Romanian identity of the native population, with one newly created".

The welcome message of the Union of Writers from Moldova is a quote from Mircea Eliade: "We invite you to become initiated in the literary life of Bessarabia, border Romanian land subjected to a long, too long terror of history".

The national poet of Moldova and Romania, Mihai Eminescu was born and lived outside of the territory of the current Republic of Moldova and considered himself Romanian. He is often quoted as saying We are Romanians, period. (Suntem români şi punct).

== Demographics ==
The 2014 census reported an estimated 2,998,235 people (without Transnistria), out of which 2,804,801 were actually covered by the census. Among them, 2,068,068 or 73.7% declared themselves Moldovans and 192,800 or 6.9% Romanians. Some organisations like the Liberal party of Moldova have criticised the census results, claiming Romanians comprise 85% of the population and that census officials have pressured respondents to declare themselves Moldovans instead of Romanians and have purposefully failed to cover urban respondents who are more likely to declare themselves Romanians as opposed to Moldovans.

The previous 2004 census results reported that out of the 3,383,332 people living in Moldova (without Transnistria), 2,564,849 or 75.81% declared themselves Moldovans and only 73,276 or 2.17% Romanians. A group of international observers considered the census was generally conducted in a professional manner, although they reported several cases when enumerators encouraged respondents to declare themselves Moldovans rather than Romanians.

The 2001 census in Ukraine counted 258,600 Moldovans and 150,989 Romanians. The self-identified Moldovans live mostly in the southern and northern areas of historical Bessarabia (specifically in the Budjak region of Odesa Oblast and in Novoselytsia Raion of Chernivtsi Oblast), whereas the self-identified Romanians live mostly in Northern Bukovina and Hertsa region of Chernivtsi Oblast.

In Russia, 156,400 Moldovans have been counted in the 2010 Russian census. They are concentrated mostly in Moscow, but also in some rural areas in Kuban, southern Siberia, and the Russian Far East, where they migrated or were deported generations ago. Around 14,000 Moldovans live in Kazakhstan, mostly in the former capital Almaty, but also in some rural areas in the northern parts of the country.

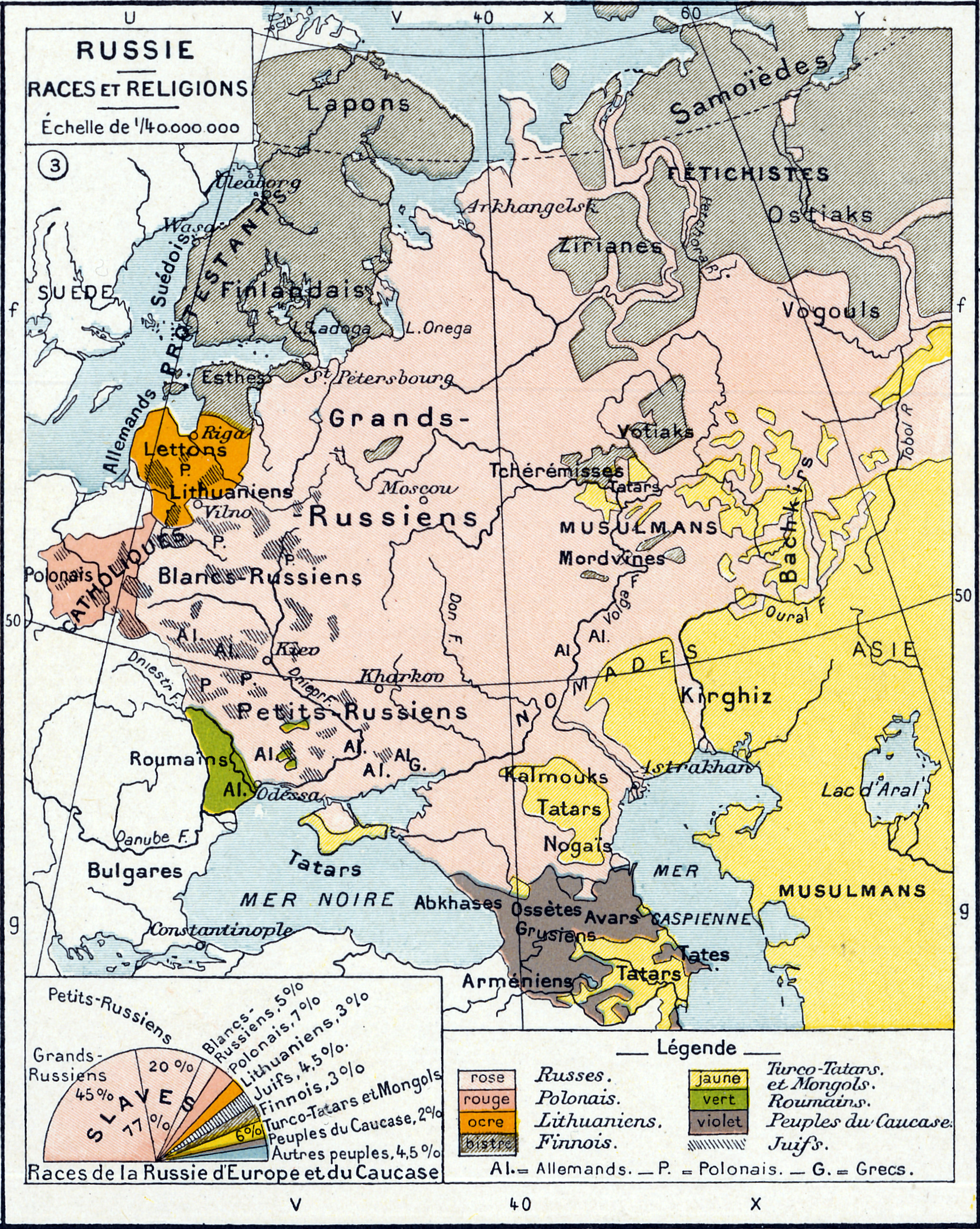
Late 19th century French ethnic map of European Russia, highlighting the Romanians of Bessarabia Governorate in green

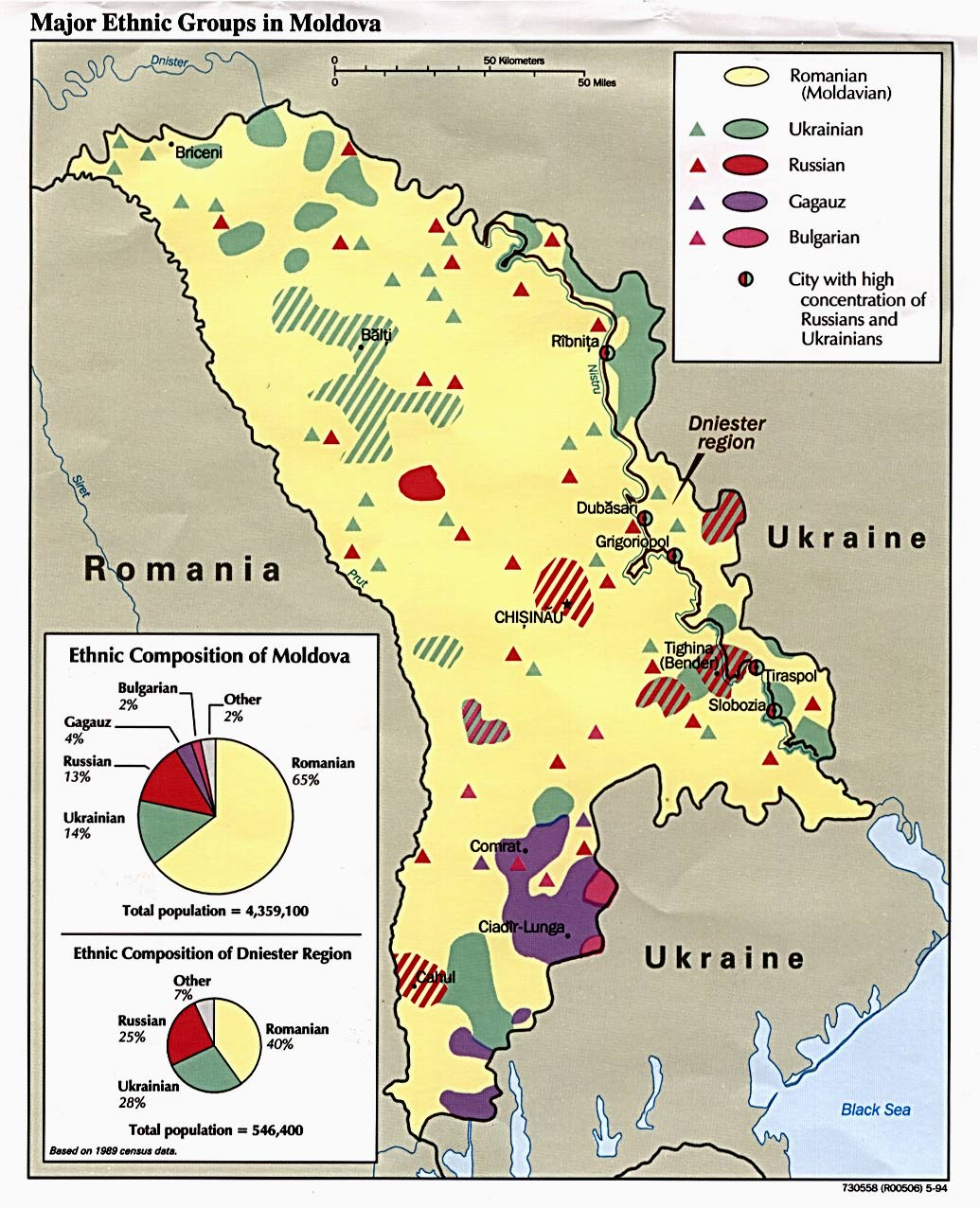
Major ethnic groups in MSSR in 1989

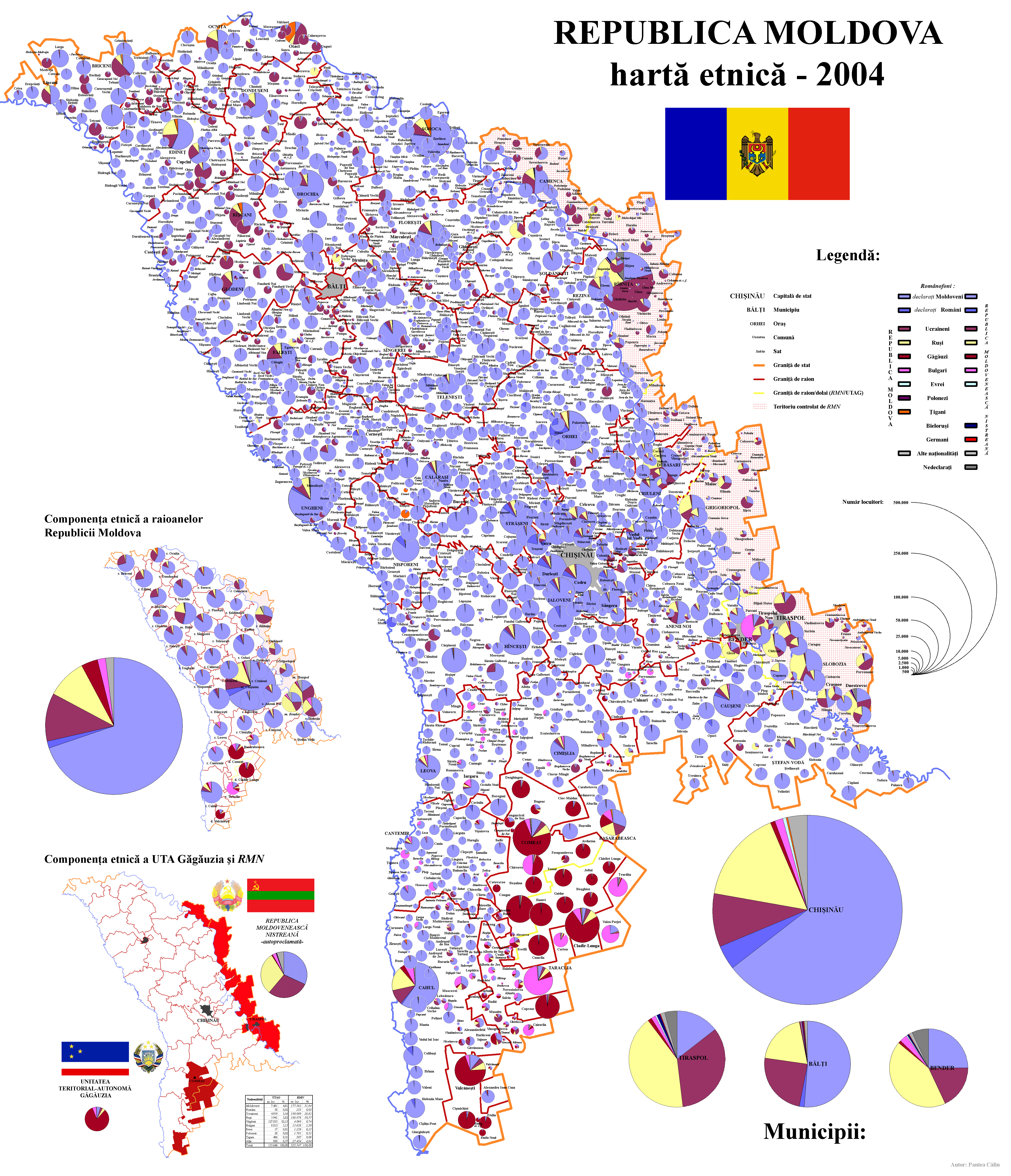
Ethnic composition of the Republic of Moldova according to the 2004 census; self-reported Moldovans in blue/purple

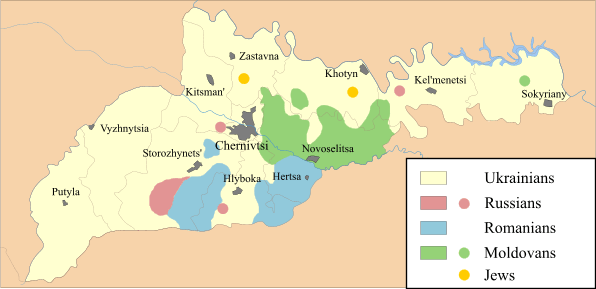
Ethnic divisions in Chernivtsi Oblast (Ukraine) with self-declared Moldovans in green and self-declared Romanians in blue (1980)

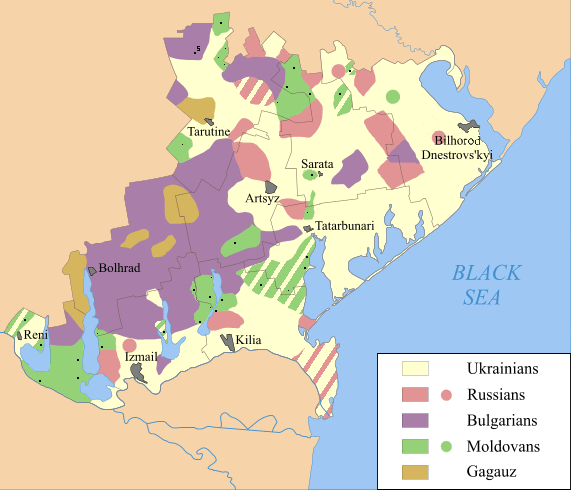
Ethnic division of Budjak (Ukraine) with self-declared Moldovans in green (1989)

== Regional identity in Romania ==
The largest share (47.5%) of the territory of the historical Principality of Moldavia together with all its formal capitals (Târgul Moldovei, Suceava, and Iaşi) and the famous painted churches are located in Romania. The river Moldova (possibly, the origin of the name of the Principality, see Etymology of Moldova) now flows entirely through Romania. After the Russian annexation of Bessarabia in 1812, and Austrian annexation of Bukovina in 1775, the rest of Moldavia united in 1859 with Wallachia and formed the modern Romania.

According to the Romanian census of 2002, there are 4.7 million Romanian speakers in the eight counties that were once part of the Principality of Moldavia. The number of people, if any, who possibly declared themselves as Moldavians in this census is impossible to know, since "Moldavian" is officially considered a regional identity in Romania and respondents were recorded as "Romanians". The Romanian-speaking inhabitants of these counties generally refer to themselves as "Moldavians", and declare a Romanian ethnicity in the census.

In 1998, Constantin Simirad, the former mayor of Iaşi founded the Party of the Moldavians (Partidul Moldovenilor) which later joined the Social Democratic Party. However, the party's declared objective was to represent the interests of the Moldavia region in Romania rather than any ethnic identification.

In February 2007, a small group of Romanian citizens who created the "Moldovan/Moldavian Community in Romania" (Comunitatea moldovenilor din România) attempted unsuccessfully to gain recognition of the minority status for Moldovans from Romania. The organization was initially registered legally, but the decision was soon reverted. Around the same time, during a visit to Moldova, three delegates met with President Vladimir Voronin, who promised them his support. Being denied legal recognition, the Community eventually dissolved.

== Religion in Moldova ==
The major denomination in Moldova is Eastern Orthodox Christianity. The majority of Moldovan Orthodox Christians belong to the Moldovan Orthodox Church, a branch of the Russian Orthodox Church, while a minority belongs to the Metropolis of Bessarabia, a branch of the Romanian Orthodox Church. Both bodies are in full communion, the dispute between them being purely territorial and revolves around the legitimate succession of the interwar Metropolitan See of Bessarabia. As of 2007, the Moldovan Orthodox Church has 1,255 parishes, while the Metropolis of Bessarabia has 219.

== See also ==
- Ethnogenesis
- Romanian dialects
- Unification of Moldova and Romania
- Moldovan diaspora
- Moldovan Americans
- Moldovans in Ukraine

== Sources ==
- van Meurs, Wim (1994). The Bessarabian question in communist historiography. Nationalist and communist politics and history-writing. Columbia University Press. ISBN 0-88033-284-0.
