= Alexandru Cristea =

Moldovan composer of the national anthem (1890–1942)

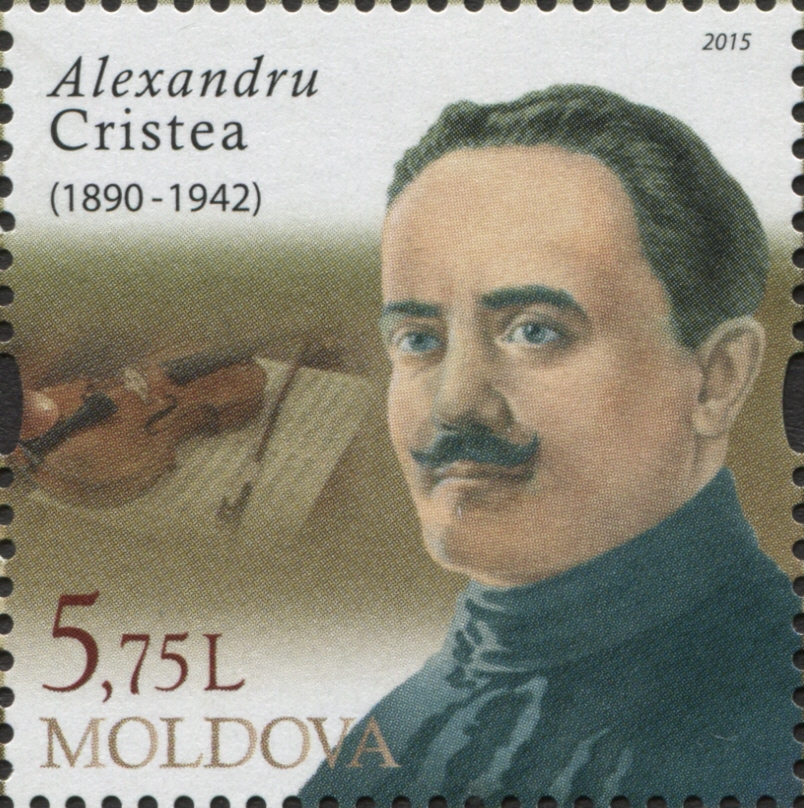
- Cristea on a stamp of Moldova from 2015

Background information
- Born: Alexandru Cristea; 13 December 1890; Chișinău, Bessarabia Governorate, Russian Empire
- Died: 27 November 1942 (aged 51) Chișinău, Kingdom of Romania
- Occupation: Composer

Alexandru Cristea (13 December 1890 – 27 November 1942) was the composer of the music for "Limba Noastră", current national anthem of Moldova.

== Biography ==
A choir director, a composer and music teacher. Taught at the "Vasile Kormilov" music school (1928) with Gavriil Afanasiu and the "Unirea" Conservatory (1927–1929) in Chişinău with Alexandru Antonovschi (canto), he was the master of vocal music from Chişinău (1920–1940), professor of music and conductor of the choir in the boys gymnasium "Ion Heliade Rădulescu" in București (1940–1941, where he took refuge after the Soviet occupation of Bessarabia and Northern Bukovina). Later, between 1941 and 1942, he directed the choir at the "Queen Mother Elena" high school from Chişinău. In 1920, he was ordained as a deacon of the St. George Church in Chişinău, from 1927 to 1941 was a deacon holds the Metropolitan Cathedral of Chişinău.

== Creation ==
His main creation is considered the music for "Limba Noastră", current national anthem of Moldova, composed in the lyrics of the priest-poet Alexei Mateevici. He was awarded the “Răsplata muncii pentru biserică”.
