= Our Language =

Our Language may refer to:

- Meänkieli
- Acquaviva Collecroce
- Limba noastră
