= Andrei Hodorogea =

Romanian-Moldovan politician (1878–1917)

- Born: 1878; Slobozia-Hodorogea
- Died: 20 August 1917 (aged 38–39); Chişinău
- Occupation: engineer
- Political party: National Moldavian Party

Andrei Hodorogea (1878, Slobozia-Hodorogea - 20 August 1917, Chişinău) was a politician from Bessarabia.

== Biography ==
Andrei Hodorogea was born in 1878 in Slobozia-Hodorogea. He studied in Cucuruzeni and then in Russia and became an engineer. He advocated the national cause and in 1917 became an activist of the National Moldavian Party

In the evening of 20 August 1917 some 200 Russian soldiers, with Bolshevist leaders, seized and murdered two of the most conspicuous Moldavian leaders, Andrei Hodorogea and Simeon G. Murafa, in Chişinău itself.

== Honours ==
- Andrei Hodorogea Street (former Raleev Street), in Sectorul Botanica, Chişinău
- Monument to Simion Murafa, Alexei Mateevici and Andrei Hodorogea, opened in 1933

== Bibliography ==
- Eremia, Anatol (2001). Unitatea patrimoniului onomastic românesc. Toponimie. Antroponimie (ed. ediție jubiliară). Chișinău: Centrul Național de Terminologie, ed. „Iulian”. p. 62. ISBN 9975-922-45-7.
