= Biești =

- Commune
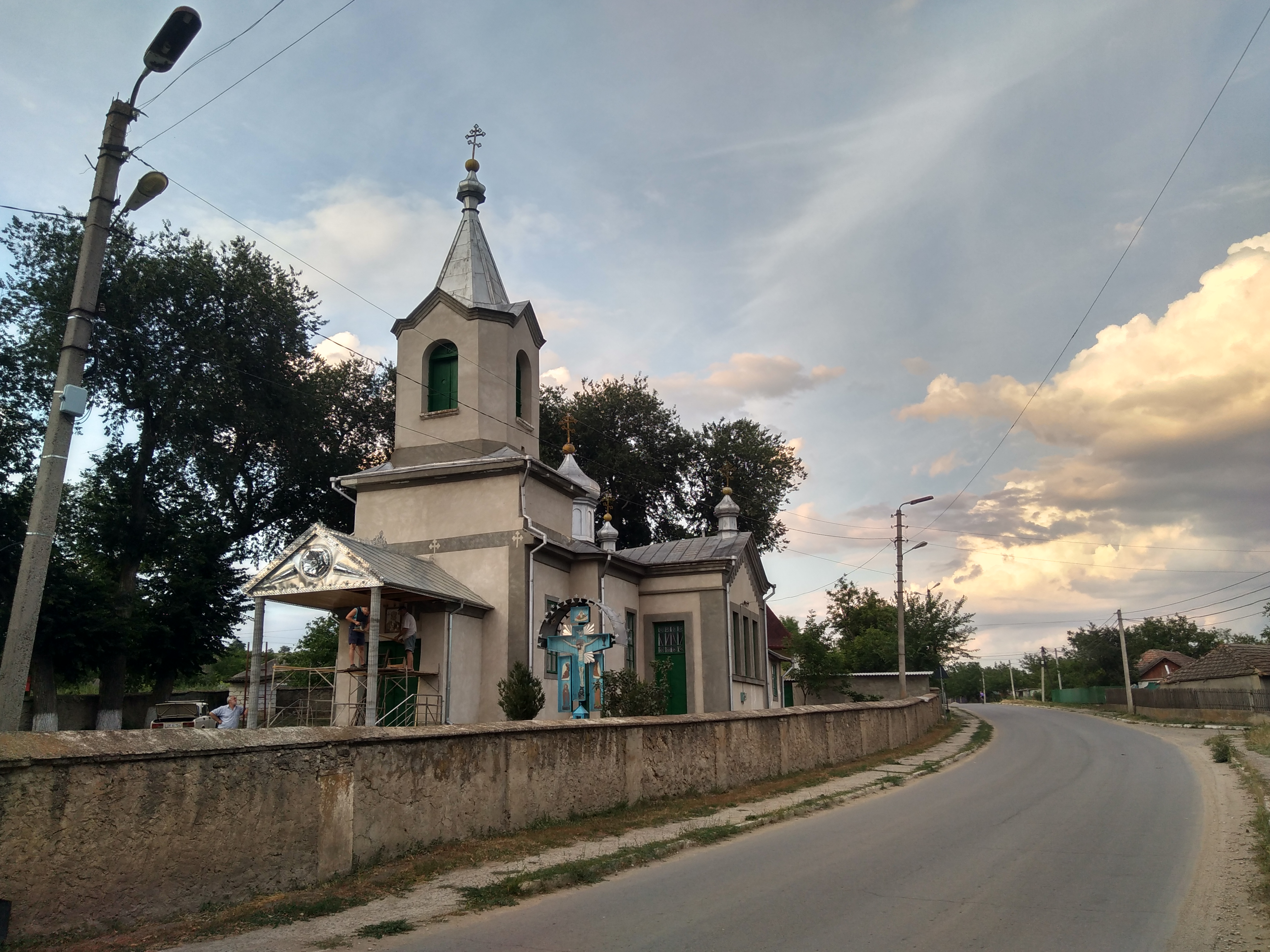
- Church in Biești

- Location in Moldova
- Coordinates: 47°31′N 28°52′E
- Country: Moldova
- District: Orhei District

Population (2014)
  - Total: 2,287
- Time zone: UTC+2 (EET)
  - Summer (DST): UTC+3 (EEST)

Biești is a commune in Orhei District, Moldova. It is composed of three villages: Biești, Cihoreni and Slobozia-Hodorogea.

== Notable people ==
- Andrei Hodorogea (1878 in Slobozia-Hodorogea – 1917 in Chișinău) was a politician from Bessarabia
- Protosinghelul Dosoftei Vîrlan (?–1933)
- Gheorghe Andronache (1883–?)
- Teodor Vicol (1888–?)
- Nicanor Crocos (1890–1977)
- Stela Popescu (1935–2017), actress
- Andrei Munteanu (born 1939)
