= Cucuruzeni =

- Commune and village
- Location in Moldova
- Coordinates: 47°29′N 28°44′E
- Country: Moldova
- District: Orhei District

Population (2014)
  - Total: 1,749
- Time zone: UTC+2 (EET)
  - Summer (DST): UTC+3 (EEST)

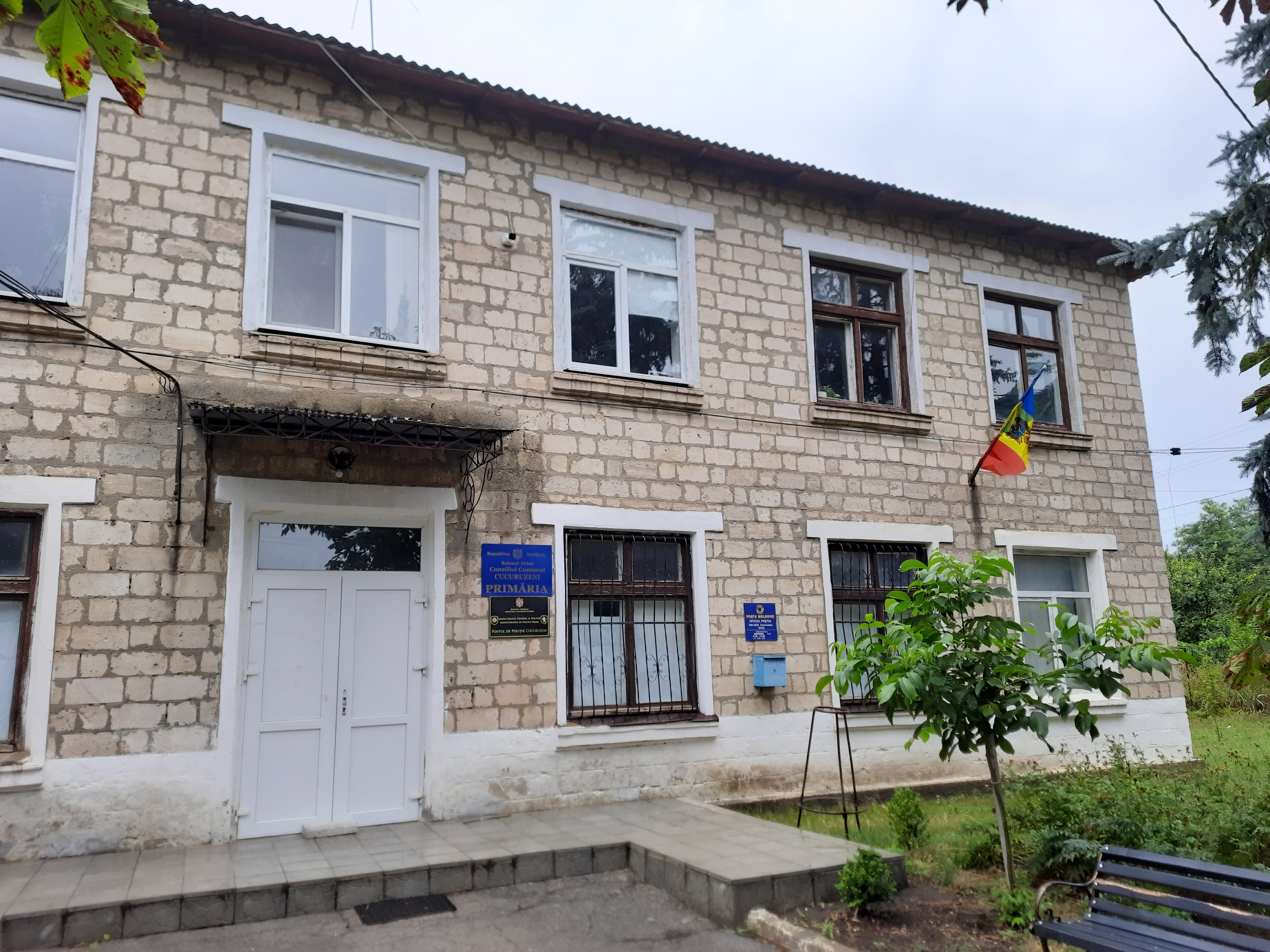
The town hall and post office in the village of Cucuruzeni, Orhei district.

Cucuruzeni is a commune in Orhei District, Moldova. It is composed of two villages, Cucuruzeni and Ocnița-Răzeși.
