= Deșteaptă-te, române! =

National anthem of Romania

English: 'Awaken Thee, Romanian!'
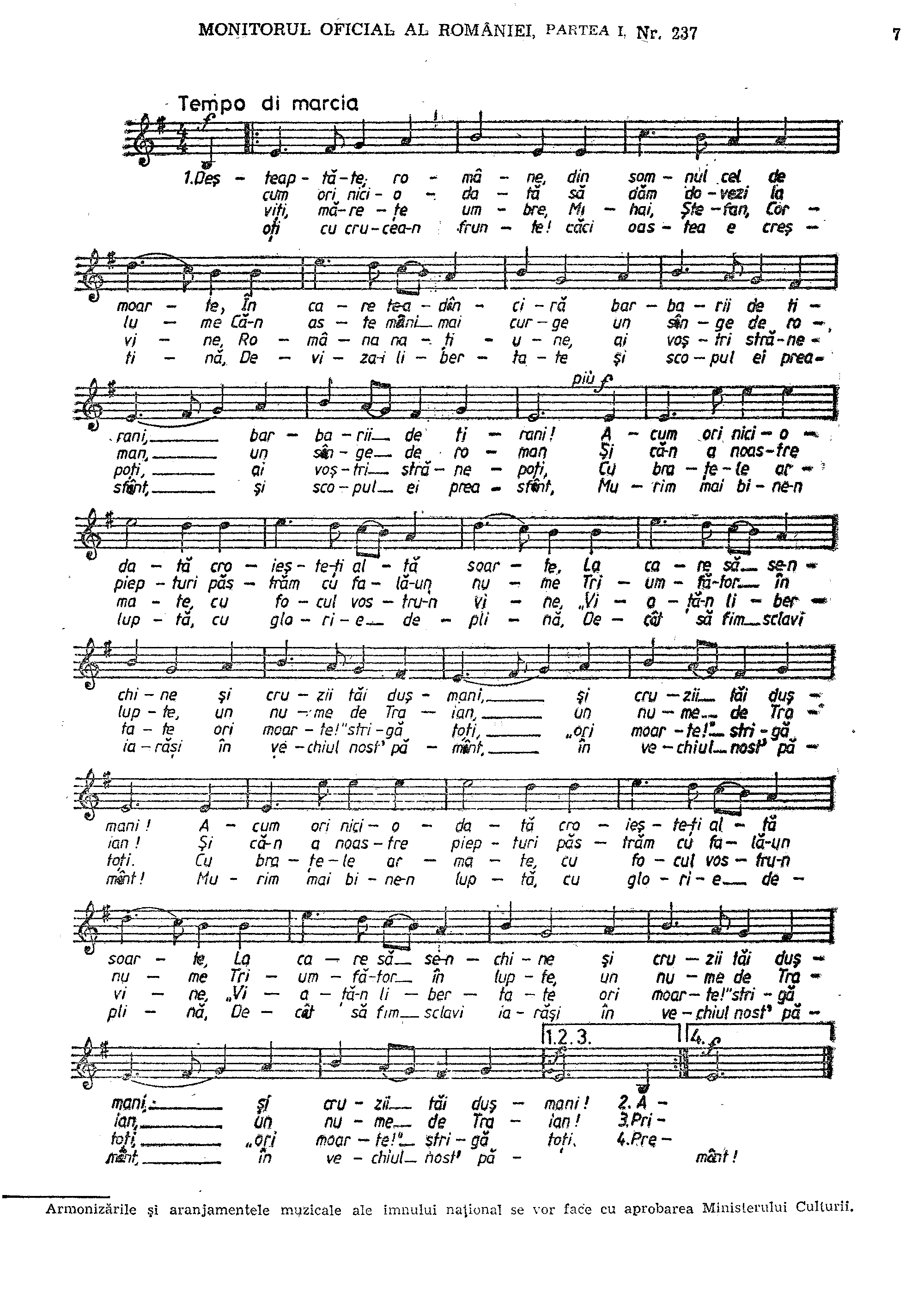
- National anthem of Romania Former national anthem of Moldova
- Also known as: „Un răsunet” (English: 'An Echo')
- Lyrics: Andrei Mureșanu, 1848
- Music: Anton Pann, 1848
- Adopted: 1917 (Moldavian Democratic Republic); 1990 (Romania); 1991 (Moldova)
- Relinquished: 1918 (Moldavian D.R.); 1994 (Moldova)
- Preceded by: Trei culori Anthem of the Moldavian SSR (by the Moldavian SSR)
- Succeeded by: Limba noastră (by Moldova)

Audio sample
- U.S. Navy Band instrumental rendition in F minor: file; help

"Deșteaptă-te, române!" (Romanian: [deʃˈte̯aptəte roˈmɨne]; lit. 'Awaken Thee, Romanian!') is the national anthem of Romania. It originated from a poem written during the Wallachian Revolution of 1848.

The lyrics were composed by Andrei Mureșanu and published during the 1848 revolution, initially with the name "Un răsunet" ('An Echo'), as a lyrical response to Vasile Alecsandri's poem "Către Români" ('To Romanians'), later known as "Deșteptarea României" ('The Awakening of Romania'), from which Mureșanu took inspiration for many of the themes and motifs of his own lyrics, a fact that is reflected in the overall similarity between the two poems. The original text was written in the Romanian Cyrillic alphabet. It was first sung in late June in the same year in the city of Brașov, on the streets of the Șcheii Brașovului neighborhood and it became immediately the revolutionary anthem.

Since then, this patriotic song has been sung during all major Romanian conflicts, including during the 1989 anti-communist revolution. After the revolution, it became the national anthem on 24 January 1990, replacing the communist-era national anthem "Trei culori" ('Three Colours').

29 July, the National Anthem Day (Ziua Imnului național), is an annual observance in Romania.

The anthem was also used on various solemn occasions in the Moldavian Democratic Republic during its brief existence between 1917 and 1918. Between 1991 and 1994, "Deșteaptă-te, române!" was the national anthem of Moldova before it was subsequently replaced by "Limba noastră" ('Our Language').

== History ==
The melody was originally a sentimental song called "Din sânul maicii mele" composed by Anton Pann after hearing the poem. In 1848 Andrei Mureșanu wrote the poem "Un răsunet" and asked Gheorghe Ucenescu, a Șcheii Brașovului Church singer, to find him a suitable melody. After Ucenescu sang him several lay melodies, Mureșanu chose Anton Pann's song instead.

First sung during the uprisings of 1848, "Deșteaptă-te române!" became a favourite among Romanians and it has seen play during various historical events, including as part of Romania's declaration of independence from the Ottoman Empire during the Russo-Turkish War (1877–1878), and during World War I. The song received particularly heavy radio broadcast in the days following Romanian coup d'état of 23 August 1944, when Romania switched sides, turning against Nazi Germany and joining the Allies in World War II.

After the Communist Party abolished the monarchy on 30 December 1947, "Deșteaptă-te române!" and other patriotic songs closely associated with the previous regime were outlawed. Nicolae Ceaușescu's government permitted the song to be played and sung in public, but it was not given state recognition as the national anthem of the Socialist Republic of Romania.

The song was officially adopted as the national anthem on 24 January 1990, shortly after the Romanian Revolution of December 1989.

The overall message of the anthem is a "call to action"; it proposes a "now or never" urge for change present in many national anthems like the French revolutionary song "La Marseillaise" – hence why Nicolae Bălcescu called it the "Romanian Marseillaise".

=== Another anthem ===
"Hora Unirii" ('Hora of the Union'), written by poet Vasile Alecsandri, which was sung a great deal on the occasion of the Union of the Principalities (1859) and on other occasions. "Hora Unirii" is sung on the Romanian folk-like tune of a slow but energetic round dance written by Alexandru Flechtenmacher, joined by the whole attendance (hora).

== Lyrics ==
Romania's national anthem has eleven stanzas. Today, only the first, second, fourth, and last are sung on official occasions, as established by Romanian law. At major events such as the National Holiday on 1 December, the full version is sung, accompanied by 21-gun salute when the President is present at the event. On short versions, such as sporting events, only the first stanza and the first half of the second one are sung.

Romanian official

Deșteaptă-te, române, din somnul cel de moarte,
În care te-adânciră 𝄆 barbarii de tirani 𝄇!
Acum ori niciodată, croiește-ți altă soarte, (Note: Sometimes sung as soartă [ˈso̯ar.tə].)
La care să se-nchine 𝄆 și cruzii tăi dușmani 𝄇.

Acum ori niciodată să dăm dovezi la (Note: Sometimes written în [ɨn].) lume
Că-n aste mâni mai curge 𝄆 un sânge de roman 𝄇,
Și că-n a noastre piepturi păstrăm cu fală-un nume
Triumfător în lupte, 𝄆 un nume de Traian 𝄇!

Înalță-ți lata frunte și caută-n giur de tine,
Cum stau ca brazi în munte 𝄆 voinici sute de mii 𝄇;
Un glas ei mai așteaptă și sar ca lupi în stâne,
Bătrâni, bărbați, juni, tineri, 𝄆 din munți și din câmpii 𝄇!

Priviți, mărețe umbre, Mihai, Ștefan, Corvine,
Româna națiune (Note: In Moldova, it was La patria române [la ˈpa.tri.a ro.ˈmɨ.ne] ('The Romanian fatherland').), 𝄆 ai voștri strănepoți 𝄇,
Cu brațele armate, cu focul vostru-n vine,
„Viața-n libertate 𝄆 ori moarte!” strigă toți 𝄇.

Pre voi vă nimiciră a pizmei răutate
Și oarba neunire 𝄆 la Milcov și Carpați 𝄇!
Dar noi, pătrunși la suflet de sfânta libertate,
Jurăm că vom da mâna, 𝄆 să fim pururea frați 𝄇!

O mamă văduvită de la Mihai cel Mare
Pretinde de la fii-și 𝄆 azi mână d-ajutori 𝄇,
Și blastămă cu lacrămi în ochi pe orișicare,
În astfel de pericul 𝄆 s-ar face vânzători 𝄇!

De fulgere să piară, de trăsnet și pucioasă,
Oricare s-ar retrage 𝄆 din gloriosul loc 𝄇,
Când patria sau mama, cu inima duioasă,
Va cere ca să trecem 𝄆 prin sabie și foc 𝄇!

N-ajunse iataganul barbarei semilune,
A cărui plăgi fatale 𝄆 și azi le mai simțim 𝄇;
Acum se vâră cnuta în vetrele străbune,
Dar martor ne e Domnul 𝄆 că vii nu o primim 𝄇!

N-ajunse despotismul cu-ntreaga lui orbie,
Al cărui jug din seculi 𝄆 ca vitele-l purtăm 𝄇;
Acum se-ncearcă cruzii, în oarba lor trufie,
Să ne răpească limba, 𝄆 dar morți numai o dăm 𝄇!

Români din patru unghiuri, acum ori niciodată
Uniți-vă în cuget, 𝄆 uniți-vă-n simțiri 𝄇!
Strigați în lumea largă că Dunărea-i furată
Prin intrigă și silă, 𝄆 viclene uneltiri 𝄇!

Preoți, cu crucea-n frunte căci oastea e creștină,
Deviza-i libertate 𝄆 și scopul ei preasfânt 𝄇.
Murim mai bine-n luptă, cu glorie deplină,
Decât să fim sclavi iarăși (Note: Sometimes sung as iară [ˈja.rə].) 𝄆 în vechiul nost' pământ 𝄇!

Original orthography

Deщеаптъ-те, роmъnе, dіn соmnȢл чел dе móрте
Ꙟn каре тĕ аdъnчіръ 𝄆 барбарii dе тіраnĭ 𝄇!
АкȢm орĭ nічĭ оdатъ кроĭеще'цĭ алтъ сóрте
Ла кареа съ се 'nкіnе 𝄆 ші крȢzіĭ тъĭ dȢшmаnĭ 𝄇!

АкȢm, орĭ nічĭ оdатъ съ dъm dовеzĭ ла лȢmе,
Къ 'nасте mъnĭ mаĭ кȢрџе 𝄆 Ȣn съnџе dе роmаn 𝄇,
Шĭ къ'n а nóстре пептȢрĭ пъстръm кȢ фалъ Ȣn nȢmе
ТрĭȢmфътор ꙟн лȢпте, 𝄆 Ȣn nȢmе dе Траĭаn 𝄇.

Ꙟnалцъ'цĭ лата фрȢnте, ші каȢтъ 'n џіȢр dе тіnе
КȢm стаȢ ка браzĭ ꙟн mȢnте 𝄆 воĭnічĭ сȢте dе mіĭ 𝄇!
Ꙋn глас еĭ mаĭ ащеатъ ші сар ка лȢпĭ ꙟн стіnе
Бътръnĭ, бърбацĭ, жȢnĭ, тіnерĭ 𝄆 dіn mȢnцĭ ші dіn къmпіĭ 𝄇!

Прівіцĭ mъреце Ȣmбре, МіхаĭȢ, Щефаn, Корвіnе
Ла nаціа роmъnъ, 𝄆 л'аĭ востріĭ стръnепоцĭ 𝄇!
КȢ брацеле арmате, кȢ фокȢл вострȢ'n віnе,
Віĭацъ 'n лібертате, 𝄆 орĭ móрте стрігъ тоцĭ 𝄇!

Пре воĭ въ nimiчіръ а пісмеĭ ръȢтате
Ші óрба nеȢnіре 𝄆 ла Мілкоб ші Карпацĭ 𝄇!
Daр nоĭ пътрȢnшĭ ла сȢфлет de сфъnта лібертате,
ЖȢръm, къ воm da mъna, 𝄆 съ фіm пȢрȢреа фрацĭ 𝄇!

О mаmъ веdȢвітъ dела МіхаĭȢ чел mаре
Претіndе dела фіі'шĭ 𝄆 аzĭ mъnъ d'ажȢтор 𝄇;
Ші бластъmъ кȢ лакръmĭ ꙟн окĭ, пе орĭ шікаре,
Ꙟn астфелĭȢ dе перікȢл 𝄆 се фаче въnzътор 𝄇.

De фȢлџере съ пеаръ, de тръсnет ші пȢчóсъ,
Орĭ каре с'ар ретраџе 𝄆 din глоріосȢл лок 𝄇,
Къnd патріа саȢ mama кȢ іnima dȢióсъ,
Ва чере ка съ тречеm 𝄆 прin сабіе ші фок 𝄇.

N'aжȢnсе iaтагаnȢл барбареĭ сеmiлȢnе,
А кърȢĭ плъџĭ фатале 𝄆 ші аzĭ ле maĭ сіmціm 𝄇;
АкȢm се вѫръ кnȢта ꙟн ветреле стръбȢnе,
Daр maртор nе é DomnȢл 𝄆 къ віĭ nȢ о прііmim 𝄇.

N'aжȢnсе dеспотісmȢл кȢ 'nтеага лȢĭ орбіе,
А кърȢĭ жȢг din веакȢрĭ 𝄆 ка вітеле'л пȢртъm 𝄇;
АкȢm се 'nчеаркъ крȢzіĭ ꙟн óрба лор трȢфіе,
Съ ne ръпіаскъ ліmба: 𝄆 dар mорцĭ nȢmaĭ о dъm 𝄇!

Роmъnĭ dіn патрȢ ȢnгĭȢрĭ, акȢm, орĭ nічĭ оdатъ
Ꙋnіцĭ'въ ꙟн кȢџет, 𝄆 Ȣnіцĭ'въ 'n сіmцірĭ 𝄇!
Стрігацĭ ꙟн лȢmеа ларгъ къ DȢnъреа'ĭ фȢратъ
Пріn іnтрігъ ші сілъ, 𝄆 віклеnе Ȣnелтірĭ 𝄇!

Преоцĭ, кȢ крȢчеа'n фрȢnте, къчĭ óстеа é крещіnъ,
Deвіzа'ĭ лібертате, 𝄆 ші скопȢл еĭ преа сфъnт 𝄇!
МȢріm mаĭ біnе 'n лȢптъ, кȢ глоріе deпліnъ,
Deкът съ фіm склаві ĭаръшĭ 𝄆 ꙟн векĭȢл nост пъmъnт 𝄇!

IPA transcription (Note: See Help:IPA/Romanian and Romanian phonology.)

[deʃ.ˈte̯ap.tə‿te ro.ˈmɨ.ne ǀ din ˈsom.nul t͡ʃel de ˈmo̯ar.te ǀ]
[ɨn ˈka.re te̯‿a.dɨn.ˈt͡ʃi.rə ǀ 𝄆 bar.ˈba.ri de ti.ˈranʲ 𝄇 ǁ]
[a.ˈkum orʲ ni.t͡ʃo.ˈda.tə ǀ kro.ˈjeʃ.te‿t͡sʲ ˈal.tə ˈso̯ar.te ǀ]
[la ˈka.re sə se‿ŋ.ˈki.ne ǀ 𝄆 ʃi ˈkru.zi təj duʃ.ˈmanʲ 𝄇 ǁ]

[a.ˈkum orʲ ni.t͡ʃo.ˈda.tə ǀ sə dəm do.ˈvezʲ la ˈlu.me ǀ]
[kə‿n ˈas.te mɨnʲ mai̯ ˈkur.d͡ʒe ǀ 𝄆 un ˈsɨn.d͡ʒe de ro.ˈman 𝄇 ǁ]
[ʃi kə‿n a ˈno̯as.tre ˈpjep.turʲ ǀ pəs.ˈtrəm ku ˈfa.lə‿wn ˈnu.me ǀ]
[tri.uɱ.fə.ˈtor ɨn ˈlup.te ǀ 𝄆 un ˈnu.me de tra.ˈjan 𝄇 ǁ]

[ɨ.ˈnal.t͡sə‿t͡sʲ ˈla.ta ˈfrun.te ǀ ʃi ˈkaw.tə‿n d͡ʒur de ˈti.ne ǀ]
[kum staw ka brazʲ ɨn ˈmun.te ǀ 𝄆 voj.ˈnit͡ʃʲ ˈsu.te de mi 𝄇 ǁ]
[un ɡlas jej maj aʃ.ˈte̯ap.tə ǀ ʃi sar ka lupʲ ɨn ˈstɨ.ne ǀ]
[bə.ˈtrɨnʲ bər.ˈbat͡sʲ ʒunʲ ˈti.nerʲ ǀ 𝄆 din munt͡sʲ ʃi din kɨm.ˈpi 𝄇 ǁ]

[pri.ˈvit͡sʲ mə.ˈre.t͡se ˈum.bre ǀ mi.ˈhaj ʃte.ˈfan kor.ˈvi.ne ǀ]
[ro.ˈmɨ.na na.t͡si.ˈu.ne ǀ 𝄆 aj ˈvoʃ.tri strə.ne.ˈpot͡sʲ 𝄇 ǁ]
[ku ˈbra.t͡se.le ar.ˈma.te ǀ ku ˈfo.kul ˈvos.tru‿n ˈvi.ne ǀ]
[vi.ˈa.t͡sa‿n li.ber.ˈta.te ǀ 𝄆 orʲ ˈmo̯ar.te ˈstri.ɡə tot͡sʲ 𝄇 ǁ]

[pre voj və ni.mi.ˈt͡ʃi.rə ǀ a ˈpiz.mej rə.u.ˈta.te ǀ]
[ʃi ˈo̯ar.ba ne.u.ˈni.re ǀ 𝄆 la ˈmil.kov ʃi kar.ˈpat͡sʲ 𝄇 ǁ]
[dar noj pə.ˈtrunʃʲ la ˈsu.flet ǀ de ˈsfɨn.ta li.ber.ˈta.te ǀ]
[ʒu.ˈrəm kə vom da ˈmɨ.na ǀ 𝄆 sə fim ˈpu.ru.re̯a frat͡sʲ 𝄇 ǁ]

[o ˈma.mə və.du.ˈvi.tə ǀ de la mi.ˈhaj t͡ʃel ˈma.re ǀ]
[pre.ˈtin.de de la ˈfi.i‿ʃʲ ǀ 𝄆 azʲ ˈmɨ.nə d‿a.ʒu.ˈtorʲ 𝄇 ǁ]
[ʃi ˈblas.tə.mə ku ˈla.krəmʲ ǀ ɨn okʲ pe orʲ.ʃi.ˈka.re ǀ]
[ɨn ˈast.fel de pe.ˈri.kul ǀ 𝄆 s‿ar ˈfa.t͡ʃe vɨn.zə.ˈtorʲ 𝄇 ǁ]

[de ˈful.d͡ʒe.re sə ˈpja.rə ǀ de ˈtrəs.net ʃi pu.ˈt͡ʃo̯a.sə ǀ]
[orʲ.ˈka.re s‿ar re.ˈtra.d͡ʒe ǀ 𝄆 din ɡlo.ri.ˈo.sul lok 𝄇 ǁ]
[kɨnd ˈpa.tri.a saw ˈma.ma ǀ ku ˈi.ni.ma du.ˈjo̯a.sə ǀ]
[va ˈt͡ʃe.re ka sə ˈtre.t͡ʃem ǀ 𝄆 prin ˈsa.bi.e ʃi fok 𝄇 ǁ]

[ˈn‿a.ʒun.d͡ʒe ja.ta.ˈɡa.nul ǀ bar.ˈba.rej se.mi.ˈlu.ne ǀ]
[a ˈkə.ruj pləd͡ʒʲ fa.ˈta.le ǀ 𝄆 ʃi azʲ le maj sim.ˈt͡sim 𝄇 ǁ]
[a.ˈkum se ˈvɨ.rə ˈknu.ta ǀ ɨn ˈve.tre.le strə.ˈbu.ne ǀ]
[dar ˈmar.tor ne je ˈdom.nul ǀ 𝄆 kə vi nu o pri.ˈmim 𝄇 ǁ]

[ˈn‿a.ʒun.d͡ʒe des.po.ˈtis.mul ǀ k‿un.ˈtre̯a.ɡa luj or.ˈbi.e ǀ]
[al ˈkə.ruj ʒuɡ de ˈse.kulʲ ǀ 𝄆 ka ˈvi.te.le‿l pur.ˈtəm 𝄇 ǁ]
[a.ˈkum se‿n.ˈt͡ʃe̯ar.kə ˈkru.zi ǀ ku ˈo̯ar.ba lor tru.ˈfi.e ǀ]
[sə ne rə.ˈpe̯as.kə ˈlim.ba ǀ 𝄆 dar mort͡sʲ ˈnu.maj o dəm 𝄇 ǁ]

[ro.ˈmɨnʲ din ˈpa.tru ˈuŋ.gjurʲ ǀ a.ˈkum orʲ ni.t͡ʃo.ˈda.tə ǀ]
[u.ˈni.t͡si‿və ɨn ˈku.d͡ʒet ǀ 𝄆 u.ˈni.t͡si‿və‿n sim.ˈt͡sirʲ 𝄇 ǁ]
[stri.ˈɡat͡sʲ ɨn ˈlu.me̯a ˈlar.ɡə ǀ kə ˈdu.nə.re̯a‿j fu.ˈra.tə ǀ]
[prin ˈin.tri.ɡə ʃi ˈsi.lə ǀ 𝄆 vi.ˈkle.ne u.nel.ˈtirʲ 𝄇 ǁ]

[ˈpre.ot͡sʲ ku ˈkru.t͡ʃe̯a‿n ˈfrun.te ǀ kət͡ʃʲ ˈo̯as.te̯a je kreʃ.ˈti.nə ǀ]
[de.ˈvi.za‿j li.ber.ˈta.te ǀ 𝄆 ʃi ˈsko.pul jej pre̯a.ˈsfɨnt 𝄇 ǁ]
[mu.ˈrim maj ˈbi.ne‿n ˈlup.tə ǀ ku ˈɡlo.ri.e de.ˈpli.nə ǀ]
[de.ˈkɨt sə fim sklavʲ ˈja.rəʃʲ ǀ 𝄆 ɨn ˈve.kjul nost pə.ˈmɨnt 𝄇 ǁ]

English version
Russian version used by Lipovans

Awaken thee, Romanian, wake up from thy deathly trance
Into which thou wert sucked by tyrannic barbarians.
Thee awaiteth a new fate, now or never is the chance
To caustic shame and chagrin put all thine enemies.

Now or never let us prove our traditions to the world
That through our veins still floweth the blood of the Roman;
Within our minds and essence a name we highly applaud,
Triumphant in war we are, for the name of Trajan. (Note: The Roman emperor Trajan conquered Dacia, covering roughly the same territory as modern Romania, for the Roman Empire.)

Lift up thy broad forehead and notice all around thee,
Standing like mountain fir trees, a hundred thousand braves;
An order do they await, ready to attack like wolves,
From mountains high and plains wide, old heroes and young braves!

Behold, marvelous shadows: Michael, Stephen, Corvinus, (Note: The text refers to Michael the Brave, Stephen the Great, and a member of the Romanian-origin Corvin family (either John or Matthias))
The Romanian nation, thy children are fearless.
With weapons armed in thy hands, thy hearts fervid and aflame,
"Live in liberty or death," we all clamour to fame.

Thou wert vanquished, destroyed by the evils of thine envy
At Milcov, the Carpathians, by blind disunity!
But we, whose souls were pierced by sacramental liberty,
Swear that forever we will join in fraternity!

A widowed mother from time of Michael the Almighty (Note: Michael briefly ruled the principalities of Wallachia, Moldavia and Transylvania, covering roughly the same territory as modern Romania.)
Of her sons a helping hand she demandeth today,
Whosoever, her eyes filled with tears, spewing blasphemy,
In times of such great peril, a proven snitch at bay!

Of thunder and of lightning, of brimstone should they crumble,
Anyone who escapeth from this glorious calling,
When homeland and our mothers, with a heart sorrowful,
Will ask us to traverse through swords and fire blazing!

Have we not had enough of the cruel crescent's yataghan
Whose fatal wounds we still feel to this very day?
Now, the knout (Note: The knout is a whip usually associated with Imperial Russia, as the yatagan was with the Ottomans.) is intruding on our ancestral lands,
But the Lord is our witness; thus, we'll toss it away!

Have we not had enough of despotism's eye blinding,
Whose yoke we have, for ages, all like cattle carried?
Now the cruel ones are trying, in their arrogance blinding,
To take away our language, but only dead we'd cede it!

Romanians of the four rims, 'tis either now or never,
To unite in reflection, to band in emotion!
Proclaim to the whole world that the Danube hath been stolen
Through intrigue and coercion, through sly machination!

O Priests, rise thy cross holy, for this army is Christian,
Our motto is liberty blessed with sacred mission.
Better to die in battle in utmost pride and glory,
Than to once again be slaves on our ancient land.

Отбрось оковы, сердце румынского народа,
Восстань от векового, от мертвенного сна!
Уже настало время зажечь огонь свободы
И за свои страданья врагам воздать сполна!

Уже настало время низвергнуть гнет тирана,
Принесший столько горя и зла краям родным.
Пусть целый мир узнает: мы — правнуки Траяна,
И чести славных предков вовек не посрамим!

Как сосны вековые, стоят стеной солдаты,
Готовы с грозным кличем помчаться на врага,
Разя за край родимый, за гордые Карпаты:
Без родины свободной нам жизнь не дорога.

О Михай, Штефан, Матьяш, великие владыки,
Не стыдно нам, потомкам, в глаза вам посмотреть:
В руках мечи сверкают, огнём пылают лики,
Как гром, призыв суровый: «Свобода или смерть!»

Погибель принесли вам кровавые раздоры,
Сердца сковала ваши жестокая вражда,
Но мы клянемся смело: ни реки и ни горы
Не смогут разделить нас, мы — братья навсегда!

Мать Михая-героя, вдова, стоит пред нами,
На славный подвиг ратный благословляет нас,
Но будет ею проклят с презреньем и слезами,
Кто дрогнет и отступит в тяжелый этот час.

Мы за тебя готовы пройти сквозь сталь и пламя,
Румыния, веди нас, сражаться нам вели!
Пусть тех, кто сердцем будет с коварными врагами,
Господь огнём и серой сотрет с лица земли!

Довольно мы страдали от черных ятаганов,
Нам не страшны удары позорного кнута.
Вставайте же, румыны! Долой ярмо тиранов!
Свобода, честь отчизны навек для нас свята.

Пусть враг нас хочет сделать скотиной бессловесной,
Похитить речь родную и мудрость наших книг,
На смертный бой пойдем мы, ряды смыкая тесно,
И не пленит захватчик свободный наш язык!

Сыны земли румынской, забудем разногласья,
Единой силой встанем за милый отчий край,
И о злодействе новом заявим громогласно:
В руках убийц коварных великий наш Дунай!

Благословенна будет грядущая расплата,
Священный, вечный подвиг — спасти страну свою.
Мы вызволим отчизну из рабства супостатов
Или падем со славой в отчаянном бою!

== See also ==
- "Limba noastră", national anthem of Moldova
- "Dimãndarea pãrinteascã", ethnic anthem of the Aromanians
