= Alexei Mateevici =

Moldovan poet, writer of the national anthem (1888–1917)

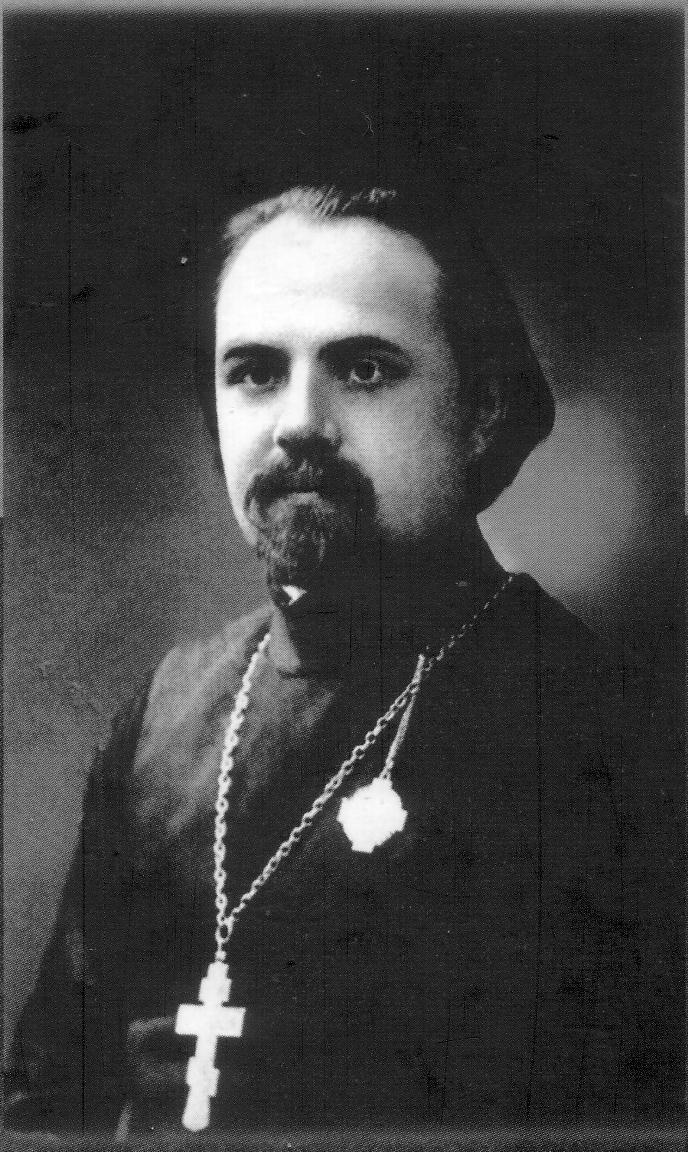
- Born: March 27, 1888; Căinari, Bessarabia, Russian Empire
- Died: August 24, 1917 (aged 29); Chișinău, Bessarabia, Russian Empire
- Resting place: Chișinău Central Cemetery
- Citizenship: Russian Empire
- Education: Theological Academy of Kyiv
- Occupation: Greek language teacher
- Spouse: Teodora Borisovna Novitski
- Writing career
- Language: Romanian
- Notable work: Limba noastră (Our Language)

Alexei (or Alexie) Mateevici (Romanian pronunciation: [alekˈsej mateˈevitʃʲ, aˈlekse -]; 27 March 1888 – 24 August 1917) was one of the most prominent Romanian poets in Bessarabia.

== Biography ==
He was born in the town Căinari, in Eastern Bessarabia, which was part of the Russian Empire, now in the Republic of Moldova. He grew up in Zaim, Căușeni. He studied at the theological school of Chișinău, and published his first poems (Țăranii (Peasants), Eu cânt (I sing), Țara (The Country)) in the newspaper Basarabia, where he also published two articles on Moldavian folklore. Mateevici later published several articles on religion in Moldavia.

Mateevici went on to study at the Theological Academy of Kyiv, from which he graduated in 1914. In that year he married Teodora Borisovna Novitski. He returned to Chișinău, and became a Greek language teacher at the theological school. In the summer of 1917 he wrote the lyrics for Limba noastră (Our Language), which has been the national anthem of Moldova since 1994. He also volunteered as a World War One Romanian front priest, at the battle of Mărășești.

== Memory ==
In 2015, his bust was installed on the Alley of Ecclesiastical Personalities in Chișinău; it was cast in bronze by sculptor Veaceslav Jiglițchi and placed on a pedestal made of Cosăuți stone, crafted by folk master Veaceslav Lozan.

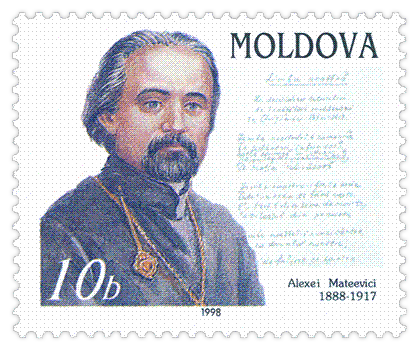
Mateevici on a 1998 stamp from Moldova; in the background are written quatrains from Limba noastră

He died a month later of epidemic typhus, and was buried at the Chișinău Central Cemetery. The street leading to the cemetery now bears his name.

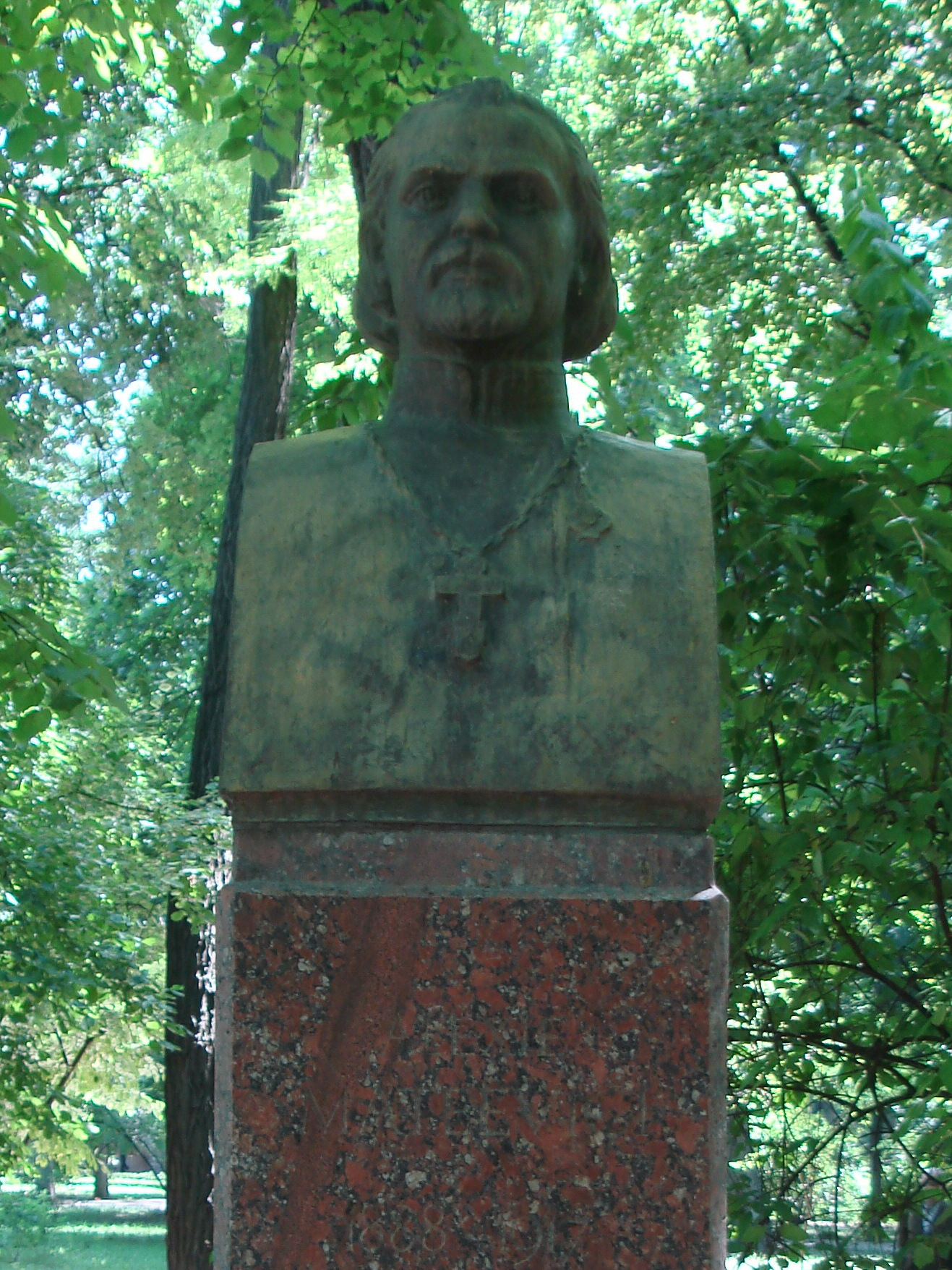
Bust of Mateevici in the Alley of Classics, in Chișinău

== Honours ==
- Monument to Simion Murafa, Alexei Mateevici and Andrei Hodorogea, opened in 1933
