= National anthem of Moldova =

Limba noastră
English: 'Our Language'
- Emblem of Limba noastră
- National anthem of Moldova
- Lyrics: Alexei Mateevici, 1917
- Music: Alexandru Cristea, c. 1942
- Adopted: 1995
- Preceded by: "Deșteaptă-te, române!"

Audio sample
- U.S. Navy Band instrumental rendition in F major: file; help

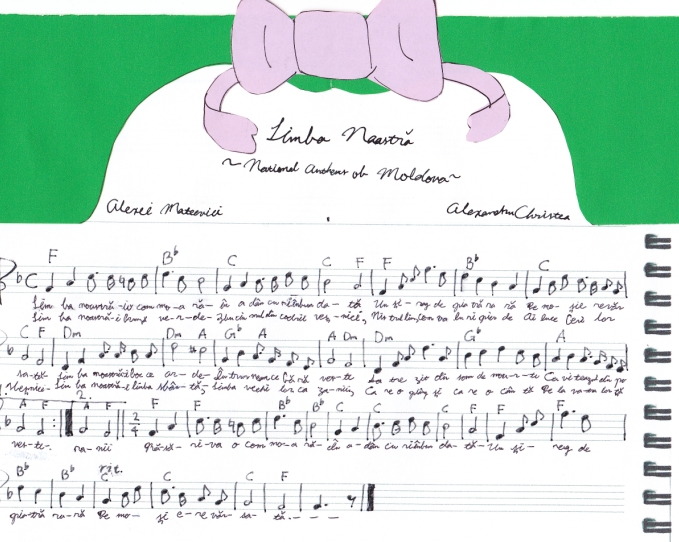
Sheet music of "Limba noastră"

Vocal recording

"Limba noastră" (Romanian: [ˈlimba ˈno̯astrə]), known in English as "Our Language", is the national anthem of Moldova. It has been used since 1994 and was officially adopted on 22 July 1995.

For a brief period of time in the early 1990s, the national anthem of Moldova was "Deșteaptă-te, române!", which was and remains the national anthem of Romania. The lyrics were written by Alexei Mateevici (1888–1917) a month before his death. Mateevici contributed significantly to the national emancipation of Bessarabia. The music was composed by Alexandru Cristea.

== Lyrics ==
The focus of "Limba noastră" is language, hence its namesake; in this case, the official language of Moldova, namely Romanian.

The Constitution of Moldova refers to the country's official language as Romanian, and similarly in December 2013, a decision of the Constitutional Court of Moldova ruled that the Declaration of Independence takes precedence over the Constitution and that the state language is therefore Romanian. In Transnistria and by older populations, however, the language is often referred to as Moldovan. Additionally, in Transnistria, the Moldovan Cyrillic alphabet is still used, and the Russian language is spoken by a majority in the region.

The anthem calls for the people to revive the usage of their native language. The poem does not refer to the language by name; it is poetically called "our language".

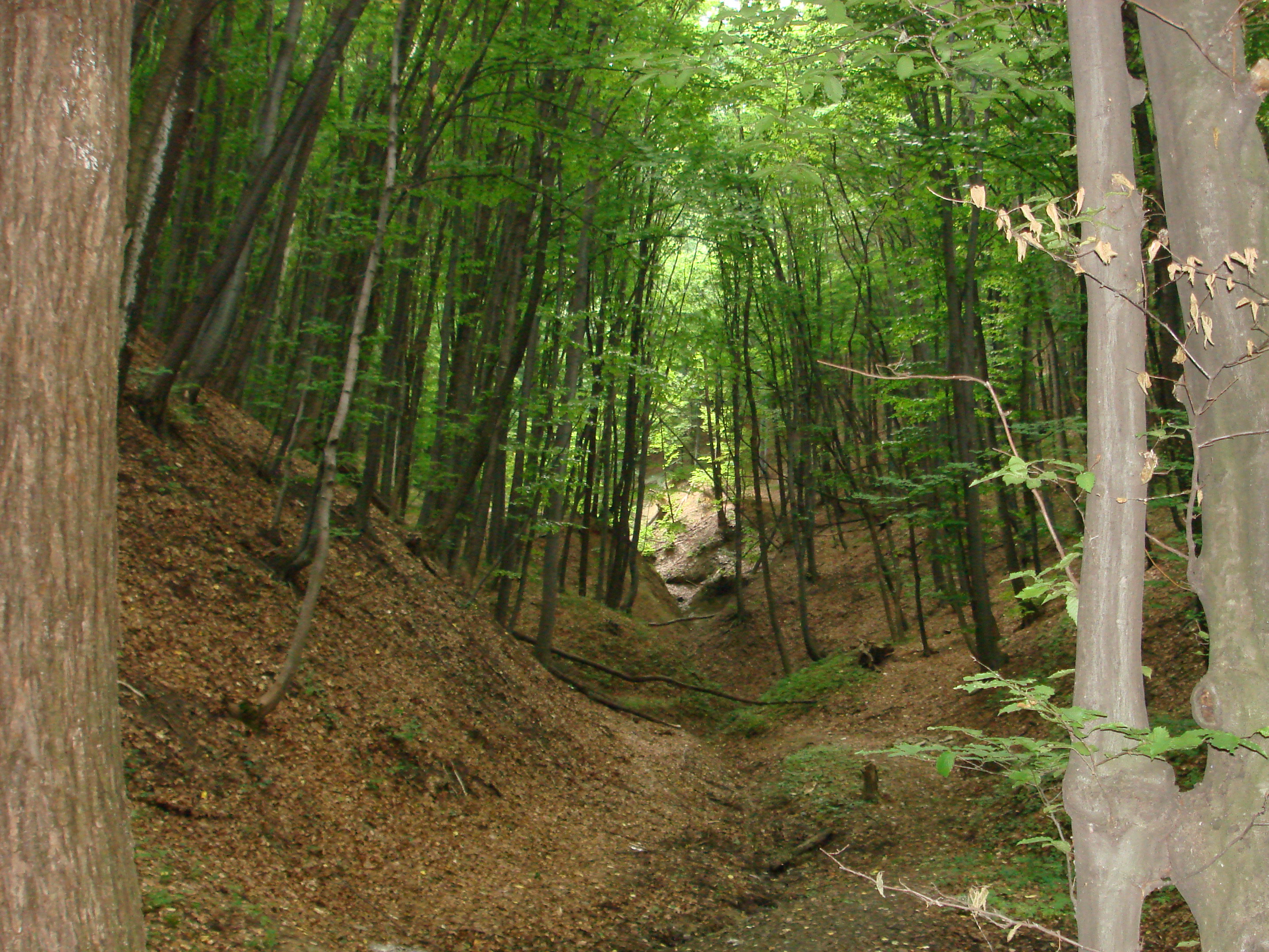
Codru forests, referred to in the line "Our language is the greenest leaf of the everlasting codrii".

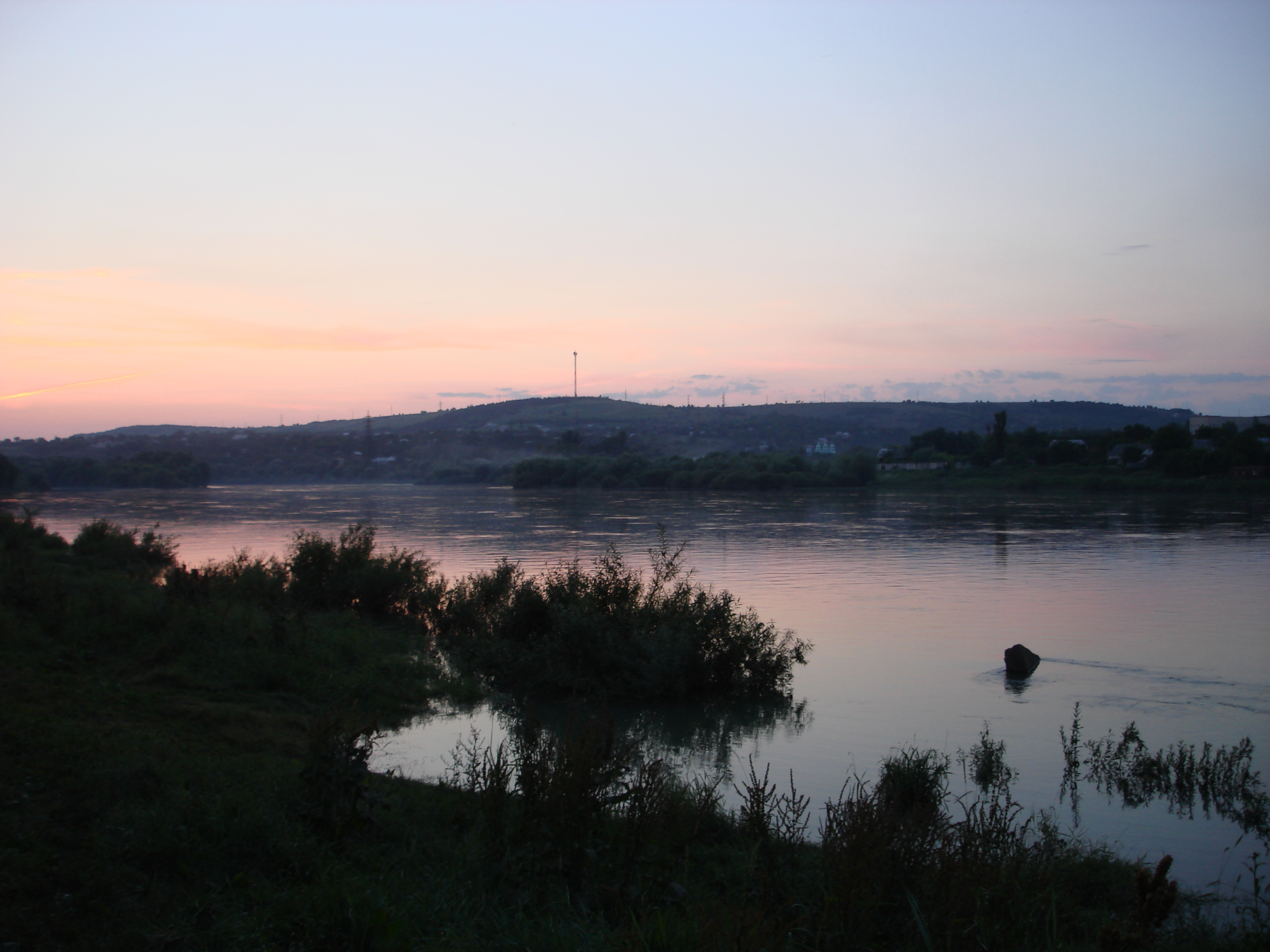
The Dniester river, referred to in the line "Gentle river Dniester’s ripples hiding starlight bright and shining."

"Limba noastră" is based on a 12-verse poem. For the officially defined national anthem used today, the verses were selected and reorganised into 5 verses of 4 lines each; namely, the first, second, fifth, eighth and twelfth verses, respectively, which are highlighted in bold. The short version used in Sporting Events, for example, consists of only the first, second, and twelfth verses.

Romanian original

**I**
**Limba noastră-i o comoară**
**în adâncuri înfundată**
**Un șirag de piatră rară**
**pe moșie revărsată.**

**II**
**Limba noastră-i foc ce arde**
**într-un neam, ce fără veste**
**S-a trezit din somn de moarte**
**ca viteazul din poveste.**

**III**
Limba noastră-i numai cântec
doina dorurilor noastre
Roi de fulgere, ce spintec
nouri negri, zări albastre.

**IV**
Limba noastră-i graiul pâinii
când de vânt se mișcă vara
În rostirea ei bătrânii
cu sudori sfințit-au țara.

**V**
**Limba noastră-i frunză verde**
**zbuciumul din codrii veșnici**
**Nistrul lin, ce-n valuri pierde**
**ai luceferilor sfeșnici.**

**VI**
Limba noastră-i vechi izvoade
povestiri din alte vremuri
Și citindu-le ’nșirate
te-nfiori adânc și tremuri.

**VII**
Limba noastră îi aleasă
să ridice slava-n ceruri
Să ne spuie-n hram și-acasă
veșnicele adevăruri.

**VIII**
**Limba noastră-i limbă sfântă**
**limba vechilor cazanii**
**Care-o plâng și care-o cântă**
**pe la vatra lor țăranii.**

**IX**
Înviați-vă dar graiul
ruginit de multă vreme
Ștergeți slinul, mucegaiul
al uitării ’n care geme.

**X**
Strângeți piatra lucitoare
ce din soare se aprinde
Și-ți avea în revărsare
un potop nou de cuvinte.

**XI**
Nu veți plânge-atunci amarnic
că vi-i limba prea săracă
Și-ți vedea, cât îi de darnic
graiul țării noastre dragă.

**XII**
**Răsări-va o comoară**
**în adâncuri înfundată**
**Un șirag de piatră rară**
**pe moșie revărsată.**

Moldovan Cyrillic alphabet
(official in Transnistria)

**I**
**Лимба ноастрэ-й о комоарэ**
**ын адынкурь ынфундатэ**
**Ун шираг де пятрэ рарэ**
**пе мошие ревэрсатэ.**

**II**
**Лимба ноастрэ-й фок че арде**
**ынтр-ун ням, че фэрэ весте**
**С-а трезит дин сомн де моарте**
**ка витязул дин повесте.**

**III**
Лимба ноастрэ-й нумай кынтек
дойна дорурилор ноастре
Рой де фулӂере, че спинтек
ноурь негри, зэрь албастре.

**IV**
Лимба ноастрэ-й граюл пыйний
кынд де вынт се мишкэ вара
Ын ростиря ей бэтрыний
ку судорь сфинцит-ау цара.

**V**
**Лимба ноастрэ-й фрунзэ верде**
**збучумул дин кодрий вешничь**
**Ниструл лин, че-н валурь пиерде**
**ай лучеферилор сфешничь.**

**VI**
Лимба ноастрэ-й векь извоаде
повестирь дин алте времурь
Ши читинду-ле ’нширате
те-нфиорь адынк ши тремурь.

**VII**
Лимба ноастрэ ый алясэ
сэ ридиче слава-н черурь
Сэ не спуе-н храм ши-акасэ
вешничеле адевэрурь.

**VIII**
**Лимба ноастрэ-й лимбэ сфынтэ**
**лимба векилор казаний**
**Каре-о плынг ши каре-о кынтэ**
**пе ла ватра лор цэраний.**

**IX**
Ынвиаци-вэ дар граюл
руӂинит де мултэ време
Штерӂець слинул, мучегаюл
ал уйтэрий ’н каре ӂеме.

**X**
Стрынӂець пятра лучитоаре
че дин соаре се апринде
Ши-ць авя ын ревэрсаре
ун потоп ноу де кувинте.

**XI**
Ну вець плынӂе-атунчь амарник
кэ ви-й лимба пря сэракэ
Ши-ць ведя, кыт ый де дарник
граюл цэрий ноастре драгэ.

**XII**
**Рэсэри-ва о комоарэ**
**ын адынкурь ынфундатэ**
**Ун шираг де пятрэ рарэ**
**пе мошие ревэрсатэ.**

IPA transcription (Note: See Help:IPA/Romanian and Romanian phonology.)

**1**
**[ˈlim.ba ˈno̯as.trə‿i̯ o ko.ˈmo̯a.rə |]**
**[ɨn a.ˈdɨŋ.kurʲ ɨɱ.fun.ˈda.tə ‖]**
**[un ʃi.ˈrag de ˈpi̯a.trə ˈra.rə |]**
**[pe mo.ˈʃi.e re.vər.ˈsa.tə ‖]**

**2**
**[ˈlim.ba ˈno̯as.trə‿i̯ fok t͡ʃe ˈar.de |]**
**[ˈɨn.tr‿un ne̯am t͡ʃe ˈfə.rə ˈves.te ‖]**
**[s‿a tre.ˈzit din somn‿de ˈmo̯ar.te |]**
**[ka vi.ˈte̯a.zul din po.ˈves.te ‖]**

**3**
[ˈlim.ba ˈno̯as.trə‿i̯ ˈnu.mai̯ ˈkɨn.tek |]
[ˈdoi̯.na ˈdo.ru.ri.lor ˈno̯as.tre ‖]
[roi̯ de ˈful.d͡ʒe.re t͡ʃe ˈspin.tek |]
[ˈno.rurʲ ˈne.ɡri zərʲ al.ˈbas.tre ‖]

**4**
[ˈlim.ba ˈno̯as.trə‿i̯ ˈgra.i̯ul ˈpɨi̯.ni |]
[kɨnd de vɨnt se ˈmiʃ.kə ˈva.ra ‖]
[ɨn ros.ˈti.re̯a i̯ei̯ bə.ˈtrɨ.ni |]
[ku su.ˈdorʲ sfin.ˈt͡si.t‿au ˈt͡sa.ra ‖]

**5**
**[ˈlim.ba ˈno̯as.trə‿i̯ ˈfrun.zə ˈver.de |]**
**[ˈzbu.t͡ʃu.mul din ˈko.dri ˈveʃ.nit͡ʃʲ ‖]**
**[ˈnis.trul lin t͡ʃe‿n ˈva.lurʲ ˈpi̯er.de |]**
**[ai̯ lu.ˈt͡ʃe.fe.ri.lor ˈsfeʃ.nit͡ʃʲ ‖]**

**6**
[ˈlim.ba ˈno̯as.trə‿i̯ vekʲ iz.ˈvo̯a.de |]
[ˈpo.ves.tirʲ din ˈal.te ˈvre.murʲ ‖]
[ʃi t͡ʃi.ˈtin.du.le‿ɨn.ʃi.ˈra.te |]
[ˈte‿ɱ.fi̯orʲ a.dɨŋk ʃi tre.murʲ ‖]

**7**
[ˈlim.ba ˈno̯as.trə ɨi̯ a.ˈle̯a.sə |]
[sə ri.ˈdi.t͡ʃe ˈsla.van ˈt͡ʃe.rurʲ ‖]
[sə ne ˈspu.i̯e‿n hram ʃi̯‿a.ˈka.sə |]
[ˈveʃ.ni.t͡ʃe.le a.de.ˈvə.rurʲ ‖]

**8**
**[ˈlim.ba ˈno̯as.trə‿i̯ ˈlim.bə ˈsfɨn.tə |]**
**[ˈlim.ba ˈve.ki.lor ka.ˈza.ni ‖]**
**[ˈka.re̯o plɨŋg ʃi ˈka.re̯o ˈkɨn.tə |]**
**[pe la ˈva.tra lor t͡sə.ˈra.ni ‖]**

**9**
[ɨɱ.vi.ˈa.t͡si‿və dar ˈgra.i̯ul |]
[ru.d͡ʒi.ˈnit de ˈmul.tə ˈvre.me ‖]
[ˈʃter.d͡ʒet͡sʲ ˈsli.nul mu.t͡ʃe.ˈga.i̯ul |]
[al ui̯.ˈtə.ri‿n ˈka.re ˈd͡ʒe.me ‖]

**10**
[ˈʃtrɨn.d͡ʒet͡sʲ ˈpi̯a.tra lu.t͡ʃi.ˈto̯a.re |]
[t͡ʃe din ˈso̯a.re se a.ˈprin.de ‖]
[ʃi‿t͡sʲ a.ˈve̯a ɨn re.vər.ˈsa.re |]
[un po.ˈtop nou̯ de ku.ˈvin.te ‖]

**11**
[nu vet͡sʲ ˈplɨn.d͡ʒe̯‿a.tunt͡ʃʲ a.ˈmar.nik |]
[kə vi‿i̯ ˈlim.ba pre̯a sə.ˈra.kə ‖]
[ʃi‿t͡sʲ ve.ˈde̯a kɨt ɨi̯ de ˈdar.nik |]
[ˈgra.i̯ul ˈt͡sə.ri ˈno̯as.tre ˈdra.ɡə ‖]

**12**
**[rə.sə.ˈri‿va o ko.ˈmo̯a.rə |]**
**[ɨn a.ˈdɨŋ.kurʲ ɨɱ.fun.ˈda.tə ‖]**
**[un ʃi.ˈrag de ˈpi̯a.trə ˈra.rə |]**
**[pe mo.ˈʃi.e re.vər.ˈsa.tə ‖]**

English translation

**I**
**Our tongue a noble gem bejeweled**
**From ominous shadows of old,**
**A pendant of stones rare and grand**
**That scattered all over our land.**

**II**
**Our language is a fervent flare**
**Amidst a folk who suddenly**
**Awoke from the deadly slumber**
**Like the heroes brave and holy.**

**III**
Our language a body of songs
From the devotions of our soul.
A flash of lightning strikes apace
Within black clouds, blue horizons.

**IV**
Our language is the tongue of bread
When the breeze blows through the summer
Proclaimed by our forefathers who
Blessed the country through their labour.

**V**
**Our tongue the greenest verdant frond**
**Of our codrii lasting and fond,**
**Our Dniester flows with repose**
**Like a constellation of stars.**

**VI**
Bemoan not! Thy yammers shall cease
That thy tongue's only a mere piece;
Yet, abound in words aplenty
That scatter o'er our dear country.

**VII**
Our language abounds in folklore
And legends from the days of yore.
Reading and delving into them
Renders all aghast and in qualm.

**VIII**
**Our language is the chosen one**
**For blessing glory in heaven,**
**Acclaiming in endless passion**
**Everlasting faiths that beckon.**

**IX**
More than heavenly is our tongue
Of sacred homilies of old;
For aeons lamented and sung
All over the motherland heard.

**X**
Our language shall one again rise
After the passing grieving years,
Wash off the rust and grime that grew
When left in oblivion our land.

**XI**
Round up that brilliant shining stone,
And absorb bright light from the sun.
Now thou wilt see countless new words
That are rushing over our land.

**XII**
**Apace shall our treasure extend**
**From ominous shadows of old,**
**A pendant of stones rare and grand**
**That scattered all over our land.**

Russian translation (Note: Although Russian is not an official language of Moldova, it is still widely spoken due to the country's long history with and influence by Russia. In addition, Transnistria and Gagauzia are predominantly Russian-speaking regions.)
(official in Transnistria)

**I**
**Наш язык, наш клад нетленный**
**От безверия укрытый,**
**Свет жемчужин драгоценных,**
**Над отчизною разлитый.**

**II**
**Наш язык — душа живая**
**Пробуждённого народа.**
**Он воспрянул, разрывая**
**Сна мертвящие тенета.**

**III**
В нём живут огонь и дойна,
Грусть полей и шелест хлеба,
Полыханье белых молний,
Рвущих тучу в чёрном небе.

**IV**
Это боль, сердец томленье,
Тихий говор дедов наших,
Что любили эту землю
Правдой рук в труде угасших.

**V**
**Наш язык — узор прекрасный,**
**Кодры, шорох листопада.**
**Плёс Днестра, в котором ясно**
**Догорают звёзд лампады.**

**VI**
Наш язык — скрижаль былого,
Голос многих поколений.
Это их святое слово
Пробуждает в нас волненье.

**VII**
Словом предков мы по праву
Воспеваем в час урочный
Вековечных истин славу
В светлом храме, в доме отчем.

**VIII**
**Потому он свят до боли,**
**Что на нём в отцовском крае**
**И оплакивают долю,**
**И застолье воспевают.**

**IX**
Нет ему в веках забвенья,
Что забыто — воскресите,
Пыль эпох с него сотрите, —
Жаждет он освобожденья.

**X**
Соберите свет жемчужин
С ярким радужным отливом —
И пред вами хлынет дружный
Новых слов поток бурливый.

**XI**
Нет, роптать вам не придётся
На язык свой с укоризной, —
Он щедрее струй в колодцах
Нашей матери-отчизны.

**XII**
**Да пребудет он нетленным**
**От безверия укрытый,**
**Свет жемчужин драгоценных**
**Над отчизною разлитый.**

== Images ==
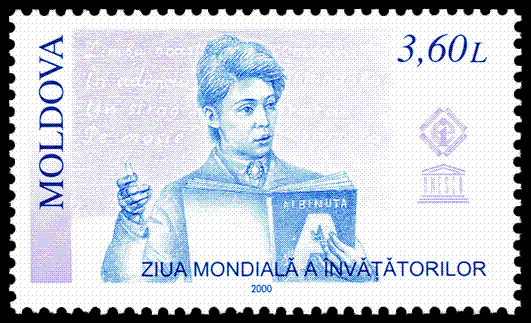
Moldovan stamp depicting a Romanian language class and teacher. The blackboard features a quatrain from "Limba noastră".

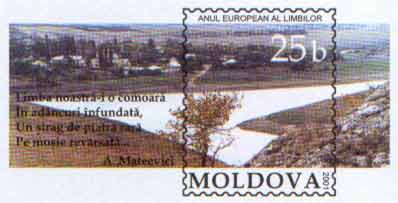
Moldovan stamp bearing the first verses of the anthem.

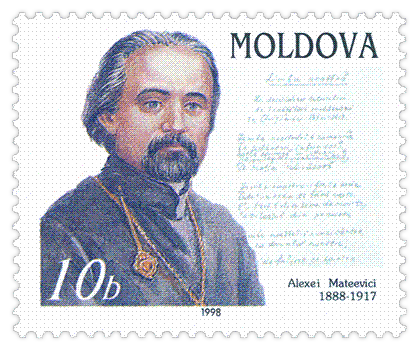
Mateevici, author of the poem. The background features quatrains from "Limba noastră".

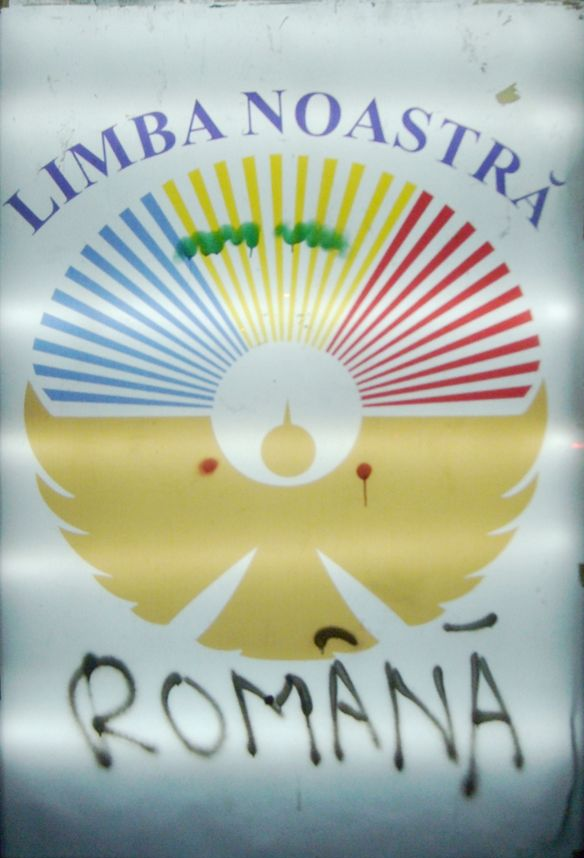
A "Limba noastră" mural in Chișinău (with the word ROMÂNĂ sprayed onto it).
