= Timeline of Chișinău =

The following is a timeline of the history of the city of Chișinău, Republic of Moldova.

== Prior to 20th century ==
- 1436 - Village mentioned in a document in the Principality of Moldavia.
- 1641 - Town becomes property of the Sfânta Vineri Monastery.
- 1752 - Măzărache Church built.
- 1812
  - Town becomes part of Russia.
  - Population: 7,000.
- 1813 - Religious Eparchy of Chișinău and Theological Seminary established.
- 1817 - Anghel Nour becomes mayor.
- 1818
  - Town becomes capital of the Bessarabia Oblast.
  - Ștefan cel Mare Central Park laid out.
- 1832
  - Public Library founded.
  - Population: 35,000.
- 1836 - Nativity Cathedral built.
- 1838 - Chișinău Lutheran Church built.
- 1840 - Triumphal Arch erected.
- 1849 - Population: 42,613.
- 1860 - Telegraph to Odessa begins operating.
- 1862 - Population: 92,000, (inc. suburbs.)
- 1871
  - Calea Ferată din Moldova (railway) to Tiraspol begins operating.
  - Chișinău Railway Station opens.
- 1877 - April: Alexander II of Russia visits city.
- 1895 - St. Teodora de la Sihla Church built.
- 1897 - Population: 102,427.
- 1900 - Population: 125,787.
- end of 19th C. - Chișinău Water Tower built.

== 20th century ==
- 1901 - Chișinău City Hall completed.
- 1902 - Transfiguration Church built.
- 1903 - April: Kishinev pogrom of Jews occurs.
- 1905
  - October: Second Pogrom of Jews.
  - Sfatul Țării Palace built.
- 1913
  - Cuvânt moldovenesc magazine begins publication.
  - Population: 128,700.
- 1917
  - March: National Moldavian Party headquartered in city.
  - December: Bessarabian Sfatul Țării (parliament) convenes in city.
- 1918
  - January: City occupied by Bolsheviks.
  - City occupied by Romania.
- 1921 - Capitoline Wolf statue erected.
- 1925 - City becomes seat of Lăpușna County.
- 1928 - Stephen the Great Monument unveiled in Ștefan cel Mare Central Park.
- 1930 - Population: 114,896.
- 1939 - National Museum of Fine Arts founded.
- 1940
  - June: Soviet occupation begins.
  - August: City designated capital of the Moldavian Soviet Socialist Republic.
  - 10 November: 1940 Vrancea earthquake.
  - Bessarabian Society of Writers established.
- 1941
  - Occupation of city by Romanian forces begins.
  - June: Aerial bombing of city.
  - Office of mayor abolished.
  - Population: 52,962.
- 1944
  - 24 August: Red Army takes city.
  - Occupation of city by Romanian forces ends.
- 1945
  - Dinamo Stadium opens.
  - Licurici Puppet Theatre founded.
- 1946 - Academy of Sciences of Moldova established.
- 1950
  - Cinema Gaudeamus opens.
  - Chișinău Botanical Garden founded.
- 1952
  - Artificial Komsomol Lake created.
  - Moldovan Newsreel Documentary Studio established.
- 1957
  - Moldova National Opera Ballet theatre opens.
  - Moldova-Film studio active.
- 1958 - Alley of Classics sculpture area opens in Ștefan cel Mare Central Park.
- 1960 - Chișinău International Airport opens.
- 1965
  - Romanian Literature Museum established.
  - Population: 278,000.
- 1974 - Chișinău Airport terminal built.
- 1977
  - 4 March: 1977 Vrancea earthquake.
  - Sud-Est magazine begins publication.
- 1978 - Chișinău Zoo and Pe Strada Trandafirilor theatre founded.
- 1979 - Population: 539,000.
- 1982 - Circ (cultural entity) opens.
- 1983
  - National Museum of History of Moldova established.
  - Chișinău Water Tower rebuilt.
- 1985 - Population: 624,000.
- 1987
  - Moldovan Writers' Union active.
  - Presidential Palace complete.
- 1989 - 1989 Moldovan civil unrest.
- 1990 - Office of mayor re-established.
- 1991
  - City becomes part of the Republic of Moldova.
  - Eugene Ionesco Theatre established.
  - Capitoline Wolf statue re-installed.
  - Population: 676,700.
- 1999 - Army Museum founded.
- 2000
  - April: Student protest.
  - Institute for Public Policy established.

== 21st century ==
- 2001 - Roman Catholic Diocese of Chișinău and La Strada Center for Women Rights established.
- 2002 - Anti-government 2002 Chișinău protest.
- 2005 - 2005 Chișinău mayoral election held.
- 2007 - Dorin Chirtoacă becomes mayor.
- 2009 - April: April 2009 Moldovan parliamentary election protests.
- 2011 - June: 2011 Moldovan local election held.
- 2012 - January: Anti-government protest.
- 2013 - 3 November: 2013 Pro Europe demonstration in Moldova.
- 2014 - Population: 492,894.
- 2015 - September: Anti-Timofti demonstration.

== See also ==
- History of Chișinău
- Timeline of Chișinău (in Romanian)
- List of mayors of Chișinău
- Other names of Chișinău (e.g. Kishineff, Kishinev)
- Template:Chișinău

== Bibliography ==
- "Kishinef", Hand-book for Travellers in Russia, Poland, and Finland (4th ed.), London: J. Murray, 1888
- "Kishineff", Chambers's Encyclopaedia, London: W. & R. Chambers, 1901, hdl:2027/uc2.ark:/13960/t7zk5ms79 – via HathiTrust
- Herman Rosenthal (1907), "Kishinef", Jewish Encyclopedia, vol. 7, New York, hdl:2027/osu.32435029752888
- "Kishinev" . Encyclopædia Britannica. Vol. 15 (11th ed.). 1910. p. 836.
- "Southern Russia: Kishinev", Russia with Teheran, Port Arthur, and Peking, Baedeker's Russia, Leipzig: Karl Baedeker, 1914, hdl:2027/mdp.39015088245025, OCLC 1328163
