= Luceafărul =

Luceafărul can refer to:

- Lucifer, or alternatively, Venus, the planet, in Romanian
- Luceafărul (poem), by Mihai Eminescu
- Luceafărul (opera), a 1921 opera by Nicolae Bretan, based on Eminescu's poem
- Luceafărul (magazine), a literary magazine

== See also ==
- Luceafărul Theatre
- Luceafărul Republican Theatre
