= Luceafărul Theatre =

Public theatre in Iași, Romania

Coordinates: 47.1589°N 27.5899°E

- Interactive map of Luceafărul Theatre
- Address: Iași; Romania
- Capacity: 450 (Main hall); 150 (Small hall)
- Current use: live theatre, concerts, readings

Construction
- Opened: 1949
- Rebuilt: 1987

Luceafărul Theatre (Romanian: Teatrul Luceafărul) is a public theatre in Iași, Romania, specializing in plays for families and young audiences.

== History ==
Founded in 1949, as the Puppet Theatre, it became, in 1973, the Theatre for Children and Youth. In 1987, the institution was renamed Luceafărul (English: The Evening Star) Theatre.

Every year, in October, the venue hosts the "International Theatre Festival for Young Audience" (FITPT) (Romanian: "Festivalul Internațional de Teatru pentru Publicul Tânăr").

== See also ==
- Luceafăr
- Luceafărul (poem)
