= National Palace, Chișinău =

Coordinates: 47.0226°N 28.8313°E

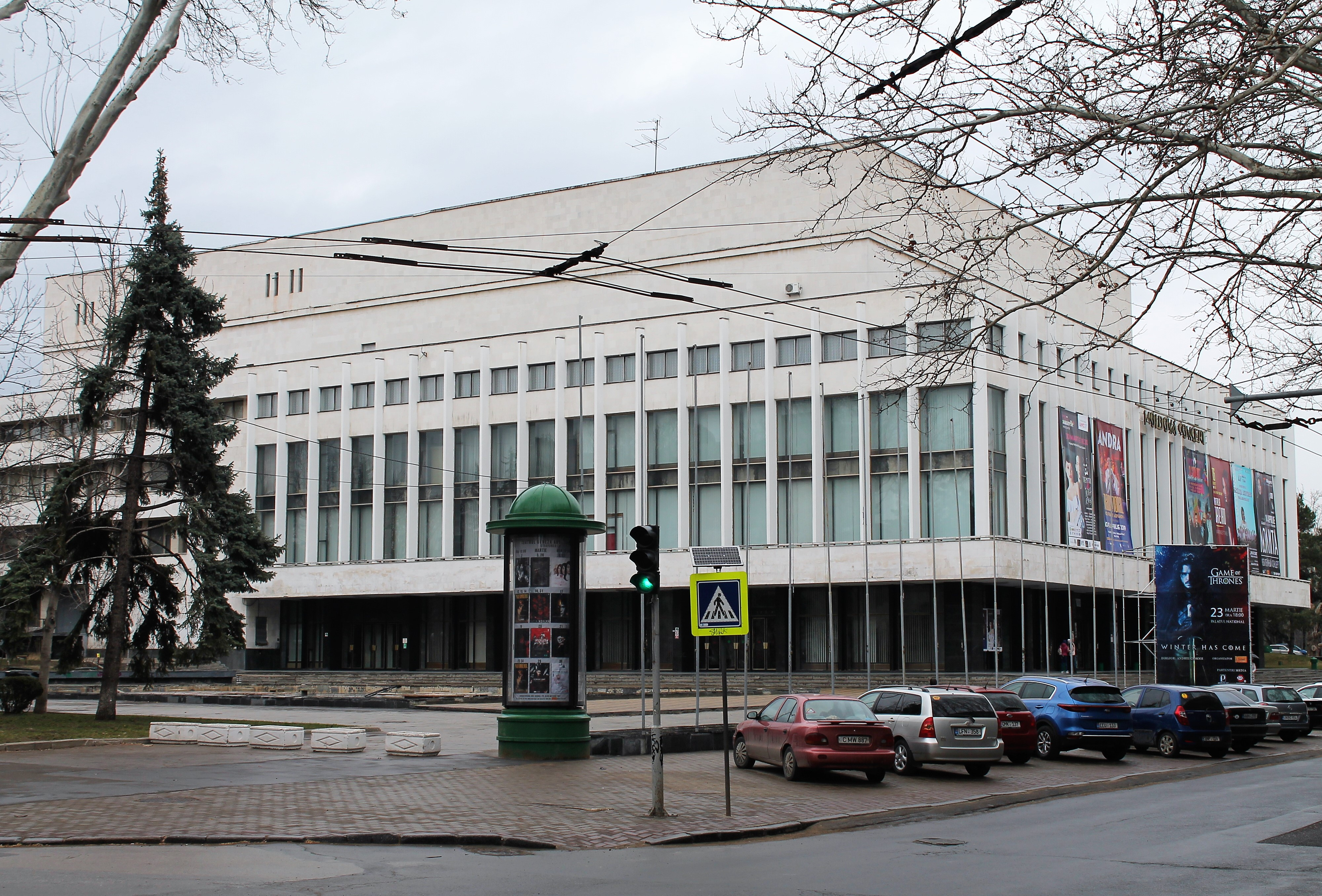
National Palace, Chişinău

The Nicolae Sulac National Palace (Romanian: Palatul Național "Nicolae Sulac") in Chișinău. A 2,000-seat auditorium, it is the biggest hall in Moldova. It was constructed in 1972 and opened in 1974 to mark the 50th anniversary of the Moldavian Soviet Socialist Republic. It was originally named the Octombrie Concert Hall and the Session Hall before that. It was modeled after Moscow's Kremlin Palace of Congresses, by architect Semyon Fridlin. It was renamed in 1990 to the National Palace and again in 2003 after Nicolae Sulac, was a folk music singer from the Republic of Moldova.

== See also ==
- History of Chișinău
- Palace of the Republic, Chișinău
