= Luminătorul =

- Founder: Gurie Grosu
- Publisher: Metropolis of Bessarabia
- Founded: January 1908
- Ceased publication: 1944-1992
- Language: Romanian
- Sister newspapers: Misionarul
- Website: Officialwebsite

Luminătorul (English: The Illuminator) is a periodical of the Metropolis of Bessarabia in Chişinău.

== History ==
The first edition was printed in January 1908. The first editor in chief was Gurie Grosu. From 1908 on, Grigore D. Constantinescu (1875–1932), Alexandru Baltagă were one of the key aides of Gurie Grosu in the editing and printing of the Romanian language Bessarabian religious journal Luminătorul. In the first period, this journal served also as the eparhial bulletin of Bessarabia.

== Bibliography ==
- A.T. Un secol cu revista "Luminătorul" .//Misionarul. februarie 2008, Nr. 2 (49) – p. 5
