= Misionarul =

- Publisher: Metropolis of Bessarabia
- Founded: October 6, 1929
- Ceased publication: 1942–2004
- Language: Romanian
- Sister newspapers: Luminătorul

Misionarul (English: The Missionary) is a newspaper issued by the Metropolis of Bessarabia in Chişinău.

== History ==
The first edition was printed on October 6, 1929. The first editor in chief was Vladimir Burjacovschi (May 23, 1891, Sănătăuca, Soroca County – 1959, Bucharest). Among the authors were: Efim Tighineanu, Episcopal Policarp, Constantin N. Tomescu, Vladimir Burjacovschi, Vasile Ţepordei, Marin Ionescu, Alexandru Scvoznicov, Sergiu Roşca, Constantin Chirică, V. Prisăcaru, Corneliu Grumăzescu, T. Gogoncea, I. D. Oporan, V. Harea, Spiru L. Gheorghiu, protosinghel Ieraclie, protodiacon Beladanu, ierodiacon Serafim Gheorghiu.

== Bibliography ==
- Chişinău. Enciclopedie. – Chişinău: Ed. Museum, 1997. – 576 p.
- Istoria Basarabiei. De la începuturi şi până în 1994. – București: Ed. Tempus, 1998. – 194 p.
- Nina Negru. Nu-l mai plângeţi pe acela Care veşnic singur nu-i... // Lit. şi Arta. – 1994. – 19 mai. – P. 8.
