= Street names in Chișinău =

Chișinău is the capital of Moldova. This article gives an overview of street names in the city that refer to famous persons, cities or historic events.

== Named for famous persons ==
A large number of streets have been named after persons that played an important role in Moldovan history:

=== A ===
- Vasile Alecsandri Street, Romanian writer
- Nicolae Anestiade

=== B ===
- Gavriil Bănulescu-Bodoni, metropolitan of Romanian orthodox church
- Alexandru cel Bun, Moldavian voivode between 1400 and 1432

=== C ===
- Dimitrie Cantemir, Moldavian voivode
- Strada Maria Cebotari – named for a celebrated soprano and actress
- George Coșbuc, Romanian writer, 1866 - 1918

=== D ===
- Decebal, Dacian king, 87 - 106
- Pedestrian Street Eugen Doga – opened in 2015 and named for the composer
- Dosoftei, Moldavian metropolitan

=== E ===
- Mihai Eminescu, Romanian writer

=== G ===
- Yuri Gagarin, first man in space
- Octavian Goga, Romanian poet and politician, 1881 - 1938

=== H ===
- Pan Halippa

=== L ===
- Alexandru Lăpușneanu, prince of Moldavia, 1552 - 1568

=== M ===
- Titu Maiorescu, Romanian writer
- Alexei Mateevici, Moldavian Romanian poet, 1888 - 1917
- Veronica Micle, Romanian writer
- Petru Movila, metropolitan of Kiev, 1633 - 1646

=== N ===
- Constantin Negruzzi, Romanian writer

=== P ===
- Anton Pann, Wallachian poet and composer, 1790s - 1854
- Vlaicu Pircalab
- Strada Alexander Pushkin – honoring Russian writer who lived in exile in Chisinau

=== S ===
- Strada Alexey Shchusev – named for architect who designed many buildings in Chisinau, the street features a museum also bearing his name.
- Stefan cel Mare (Stephen the Great) boulevard – prince of Moldova between 1457 and 1504

=== V ===
- Mihai Viteazul, prince of Moldavia, Wallachia and Transylvania in 1600

== Named for other localities ==
Other streets are named after cities in Moldova or elsewhere

- București, capital of neighbouring Romania
- Hîncești, town in Moldova
- Ismail, town in southern Ukraine
- Tighina (or Bender)
- Tiraspol, second largest city in the country, capital of the disputed republic of Transnistria
- Varlaam, Moldovan metropolitan

== Other references ==
- Sfatul Țării, the national council that declared the Moldavian Democratic Republic on January 24, 1918
- 31 August 1989 Street– named for the day that the Romanian language was adopted as a state language by the Socialist Republic of Romania
