= Luceafărul Republican Theatre =

Public drama theatre in Chișinău, Moldova

- Teatrul Republican „Luceafărul”
- Address: Str. Veronica Micle 7, Chișinău; Chișinău; Moldova
- Owner: Ministry of Education, Culture and Research of the Republic of Moldova
- Designation: Public drama theatre

Construction
- Opened: 1960

Website
- Official website

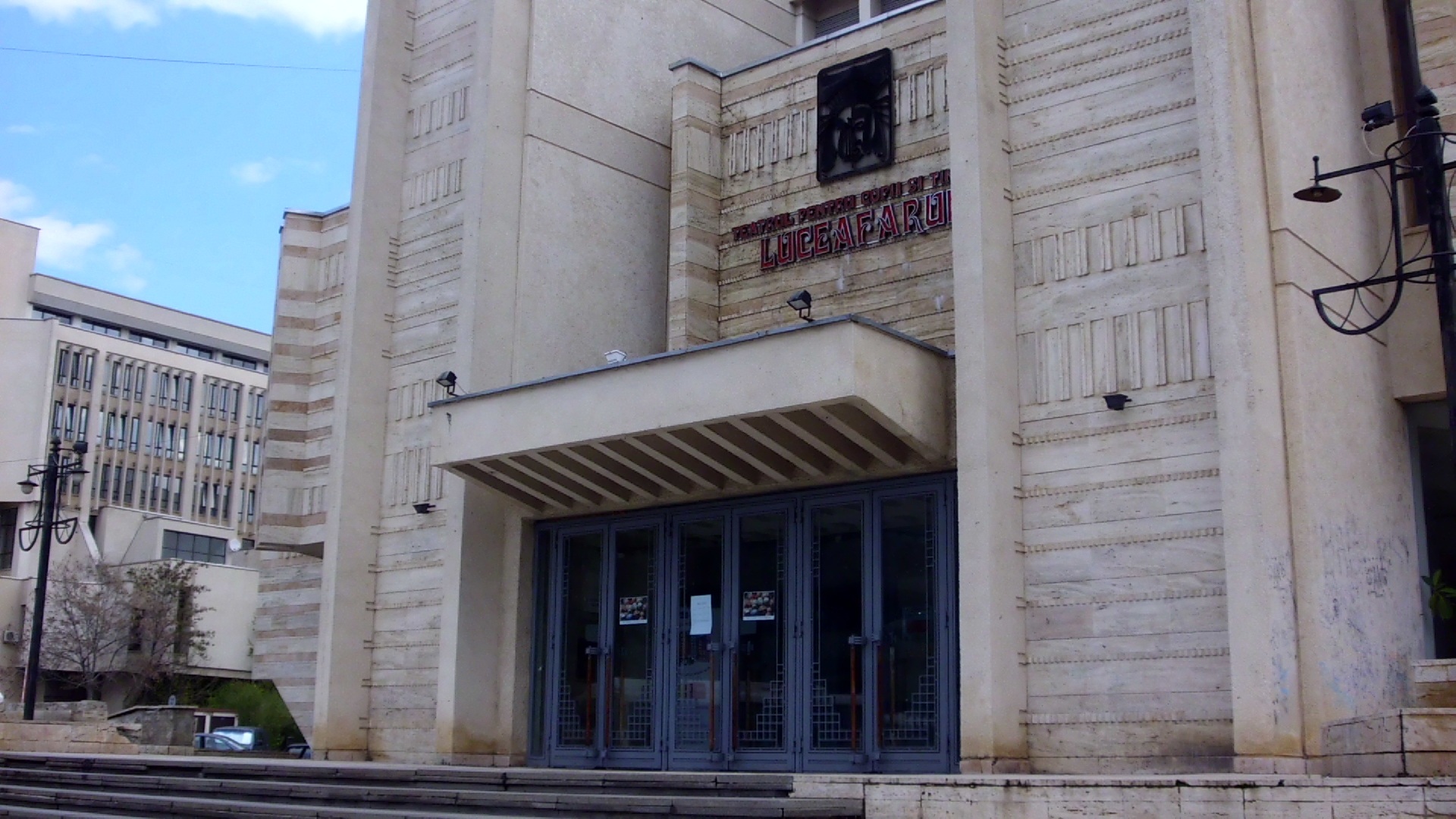
View from the esplanade of the Luceafărul Theater, April 2014

The Luceafărul Republican Theatre (Romanian: Teatrul Republican „Luceafărul”) is a public drama theatre in Chișinău, Moldova, located at 7 Veronica Micle Street. It was founded in 1960 as a theatre for children and youth and currently holds the status of a republican drama theatre, operating under the Ministry of Education, Culture and Research of the Republic of Moldova.

== History ==
- 1960 – The theatre was inaugurated as the Luceafărul Theatre for Children and Youth, following the reorganization of the former Licurici theatre.
- 1960s–1970s – It became a cultural centre of Moldova’s theatrical life, attracting graduates of the Shchukin Theatre Institute, as well as renowned playwrights, visual artists, composers, and poets.
- 1989–1991 – The theatre staged experimental works such as Waiting for Godot (1989), paving the way for the foundation of the Eugene Ionesco Theatre in 1991.
- 1990s–2000s – Under the leadership of Boris Focșa, the repertoire was expanded with classical works and children’s performances, while the company welcomed new actors.
- 2006–2007 – The theatre celebrated the artistic careers of Nina Doni and Paulina Zavtoni. Productions such as The Threepenny Opera, Turandot, and Karlsson-on-the-Roof were staged, with The Threepenny Opera being named the best show of the year at the UNITEM Gala.
- 2010 – The troupe participated in the Cairo International Festival for Experimental Theatre, presenting The Good Person of Szechwan and winning two awards: for best directing and best collective performance.
- 1991–present – Since 1991, the institution has been officially known as the Luceafărul Republican Theatre, under the auspices of the Ministry of Education, Culture and Research.

== Repertoire ==
The theatre’s repertoire combines classical drama, contemporary plays, and children’s productions. Notable titles include: Liliom, Furniture and Pain, Pinocchio, La Cage aux Folles, Three Sisters (after Anton Chekhov), and 12 Angry Men.

== Location and building ==
- Address: 7 Veronica Micle Street, Chișinău, Moldova.
- The theatre is situated near important landmarks, including the National Theatre Mihai Eminescu, Chișinău City Hall, and the National Library.
- The auditorium is noted for its vintage-style atmosphere and intimate setting, making it suitable for diverse audiences.

== Company and staff ==
The acting troupe includes both established and emerging performers. Among the notable actors are: Liuba Roman, Ion Liulica, Radu Canțîr, Maria Anton, Irina Vacarciuc, Nina Doni, Inga Petica, Victor Triboi, Eleonora Dolghii, Vitalia Grigoriu, Ecaterina Danuta, Ion Prisacara, Oleg Macovei, Dorina Tataru, Oleg Lungu, Paulina Zavtoni, Ion Jitari, Rodica Mereuta, and Gigi Tabarcea.

== Administration and transparency ==
As a state institution, the theatre regularly publishes activity reports, financial statements, and procurement plans on its official website, ensuring transparency in cultural management.

== Recognition ==
- The Threepenny Opera – Best Production of the Year, UNITEM Gala (2007)
- The Good Person of Szechwan – Best Directing Award and Best Collective Performance, Cairo International Festival for Experimental Theatre (2010)

== See also ==
- Theatre in Moldova
- National Theatre Mihai Eminescu
