= Basarabia Reînnoită =

Defunct newspaper from Iaşi, Romania

- Founder: Leonida Stamati
- Editor-in-chief: V. Brăiescu
- Founded: March 1907
- Language: Romanian
- Headquarters: 52 Golia St. Iaşi: tip. "Dacia"

Basarabia Reînnoită (English: The Bessarabia Renewal) was a newspaper from Iaşi, Romania, founded in March 1907 by Leonida Stamati, a boyar from Soroca involved in politics. After four issues, the newspaper was closed at the request of the Russian authorities.

== Bibliography ==
- Almanahul dicţionar al presei din România şi a celei româneşti de pretutindeni de G. Caliga. – București, 1926. – p. 155.
