= Făclia Țării =

Făclia Ţării
- Editor: C. S. Costinovici
- Staff writers: Gheorghe S. Todor, S. Dănilă, Nadejda Todorova
- Founded: 1912
- Language: Romanian
- Headquarters: Chişinău

Făclia Ţării (English: The Country Torch) was a newspaper from Chişinău, Bessarabia, founded in 1912.

== Overview ==
C. S. Costinovici was the editor and Gheorghe S. Todor (Iorgu Tudor) the editorial secretary. The redactors of the newspaper were S. Dănilă, Nadejda Todorova. The newspapers was printed at the Diocesan Printing in Chişinău.

In 1912, the Russian authorities celebrated the 100th anniversary of the Russian annexation of Bessarabia. The author of the article "One hundred years", printed in the first issue of Făclia Ţării, wrote: "Our country is in darkness as one hundred years ago". Although the newspaper was initially authorized to function, the authorities closed down Făclia Ţării as soon as possible after this issue.

== Bibliography ==
- Pamfilie T. O gazetă moldovenească basarabeană sugrumată "Făclia Ţării" // Şcoala Basarabeană. – 1919. – nr. 12. – P. 30–32.
- Almanahul dicţionar al presei din România şi a celei româneşti de pretutindeni de G. Caliga. – București, 1926. – P. 155.
- Dumitru Munteanu-Râmnic, Pentru Basarabia. Culegere de texte, Ploieşti, 1912, p. 108.
- Haneş Retre V. Scriitori Basarabene (1850–1940). – București, 1942;
- Mihailovici Paul. Tipărituri româneşti în Basarabia dela 1812 pînă la 1918. – București, 1940. – P. 245–247;
