= Sectorul Centru =

Sector of Chișinău

Coordinates: 47°01′04″N 28°50′29″E

Centru Sectorul Centru
- Administrative Sector
- Centru Sector
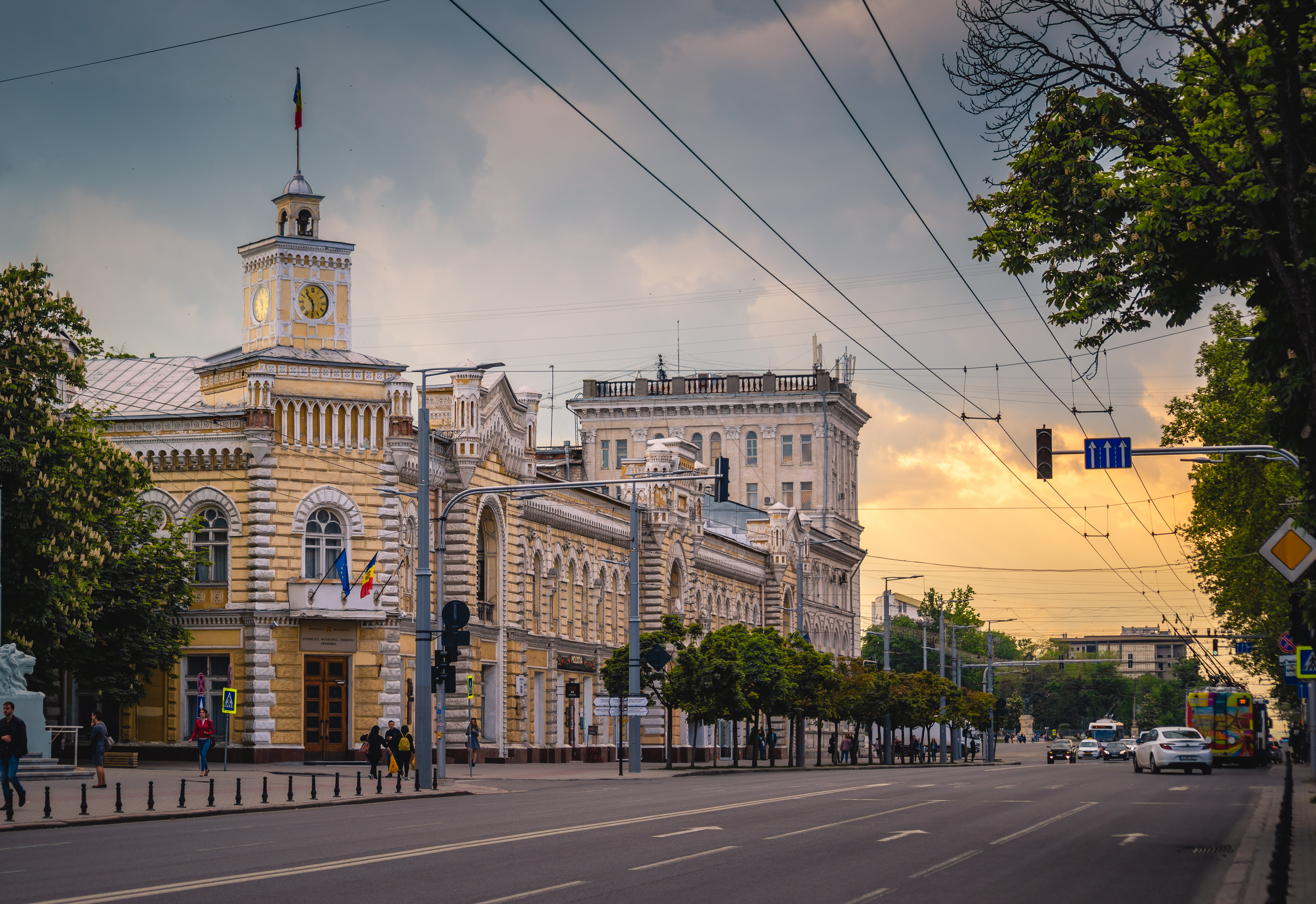

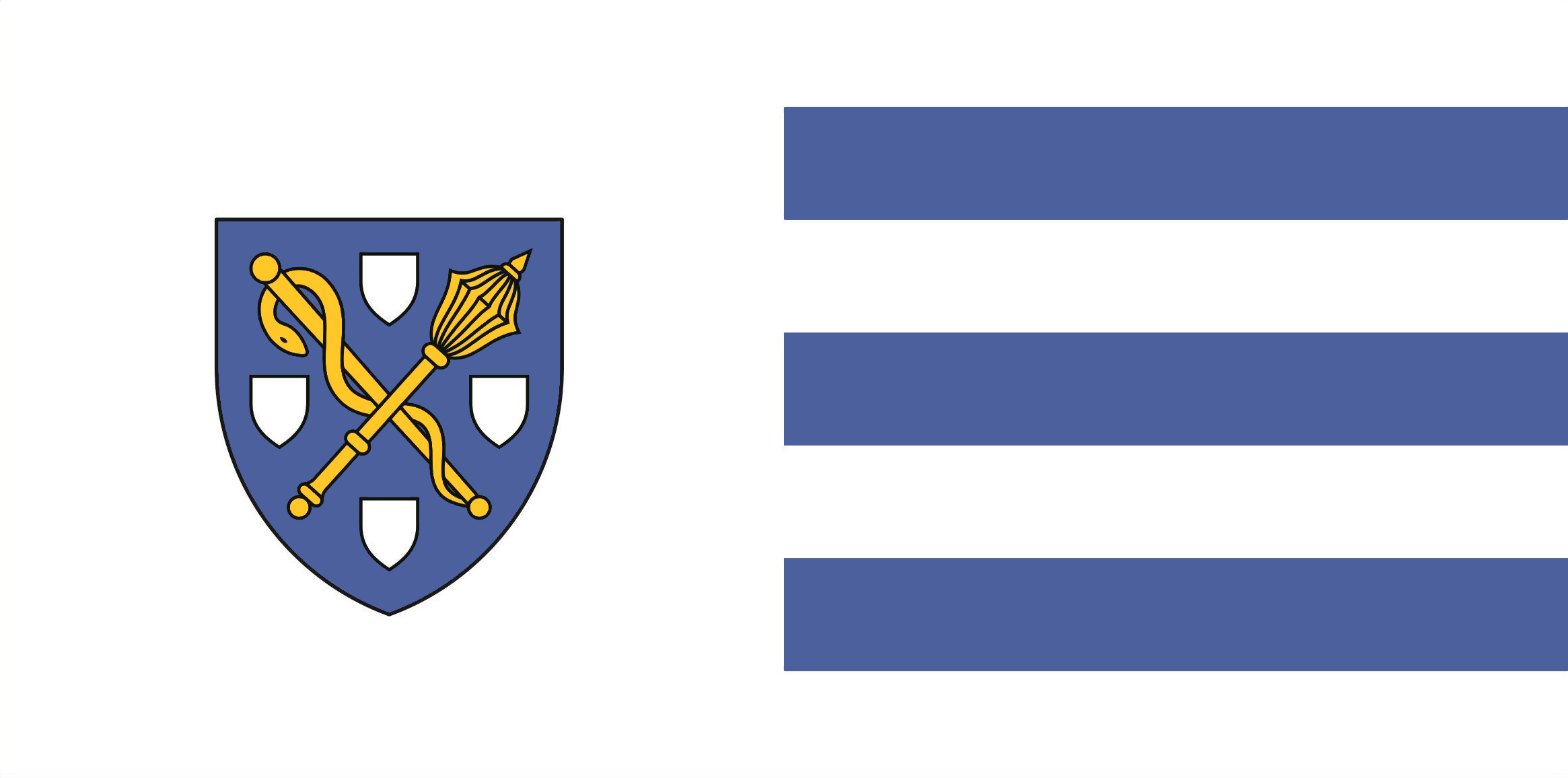
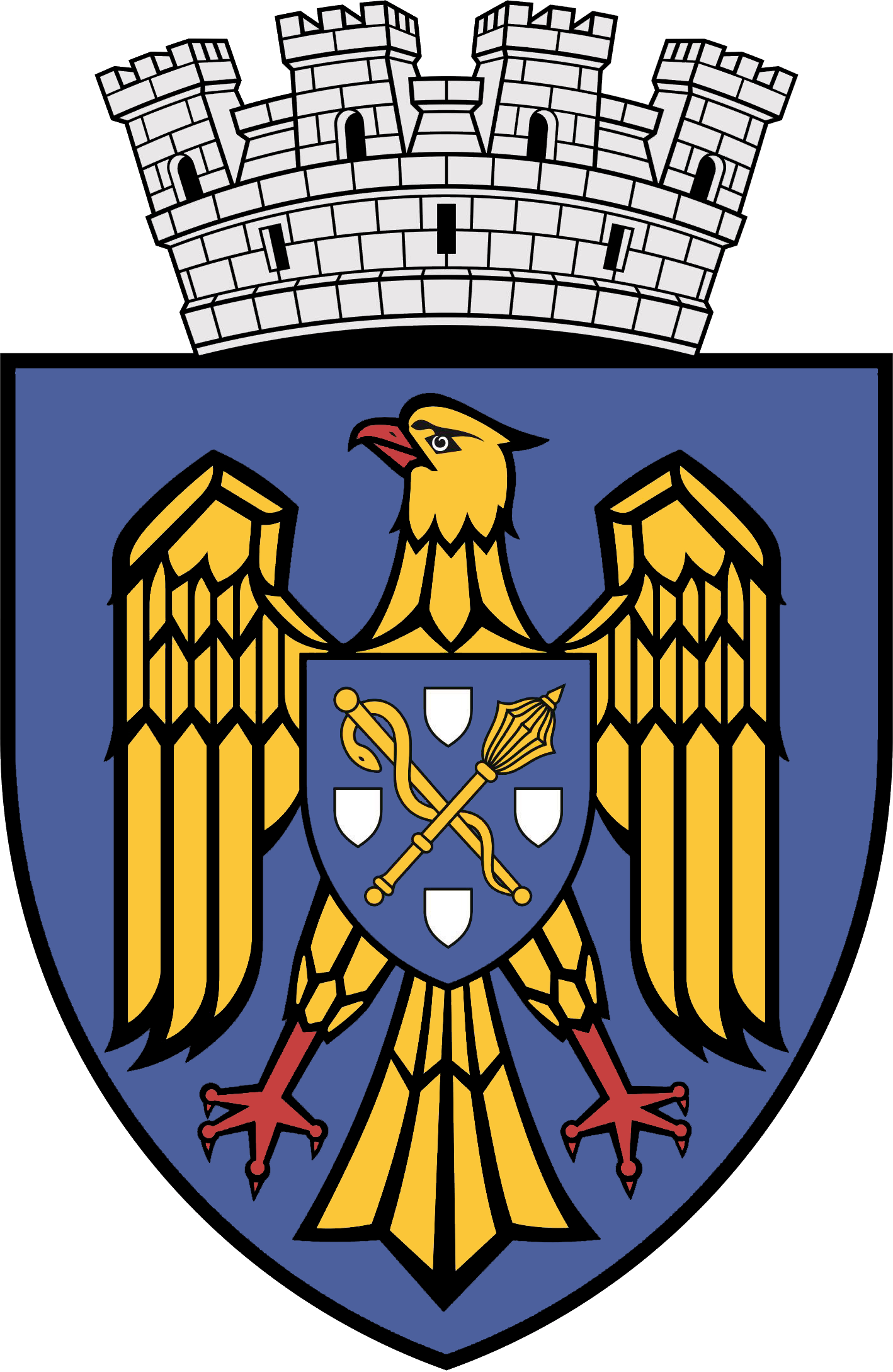
- Flag Coat of arms

- Founder: 1941

Government
  - Pretor: Vadim Hîncu

Area
  - Total: 34 km^{2} (13 sq mi)

Population (2013)
  - Total: 94.800
- Time zone: UTC+2 (EET)
  - Summer (DST): UTC+3 (EEST)
- Website: https://chisinaucentru.md/

Sectorul Centru (Romanian pronunciation: [t͡ʃen.tru]) is one of the five sectors in Chișinău, the capital of Moldova. The local administration is managed by a pretor appointed by the city administration. It governs over a portion of the city of Chișinău itself (central and western parts), and the suburban town of Codru. It is largely populated by Moldovans and Romanians.

== History ==
The Center Sector was established at the beginning of the 19th century on the site of agricultural and grazing lands. As an administrative-territorial unit in the composition of the city of Chisinau, the Centru sector was established in 1941 and initially named the Lenin district.

== Heritage ==
Currently, the Center sector has an estimated population of 94.8 thousand inhabitants and covers an area of 3.4 thousand ha. The length of the roads crossing the sector is 134,218 km, counting 194 streets and 34 streets. In the sector are located: 7 banks, 5 ministries, 4 offices centers (bd. Stefan cel Mare şi Sfânt nr. 65, nr. 3, nr. 124, str. Tighina, nr. 49/1), Chișinău railway station, 2 bus stations and 12 commercial markets. In the Center there are also 4863 units of trade, public catering and services, including 15 shopping centers.

According to the records of the Inspectoratul Fiscal Centru, 18,364 economic agents are registered on the territory of the Center sector. There are 56 industrial enterprises operating in the sector.

There are 8 higher education institutions in the sector; 24 pre-university education institutions, of which: 5 colleges, 8 high schools, 2 gymnasiums, 1 boarding-gymnasium, 2 general schools, 3 primary schools, 2 auxiliary schools, 1 evening school; and 24 preschool education institutions, of which 23 kindergartens and 1 kindergarten-school. There are also 4 libraries operating here.

== Central Chișinău ==
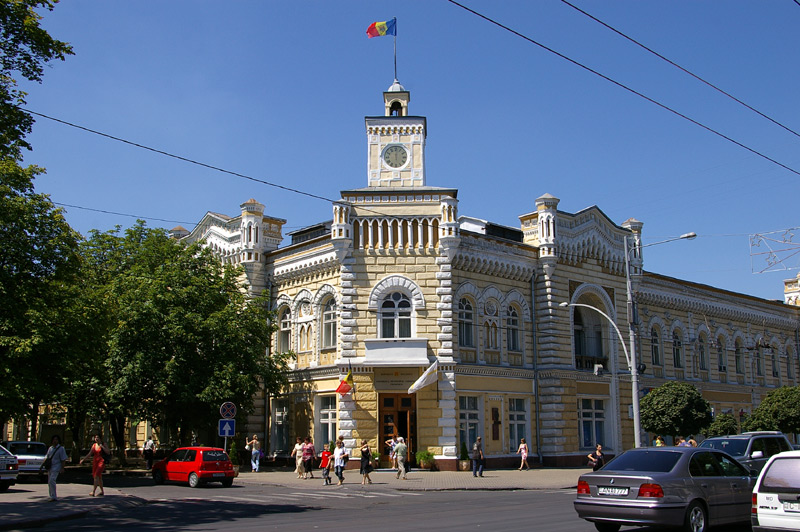
Chișinău City Hall

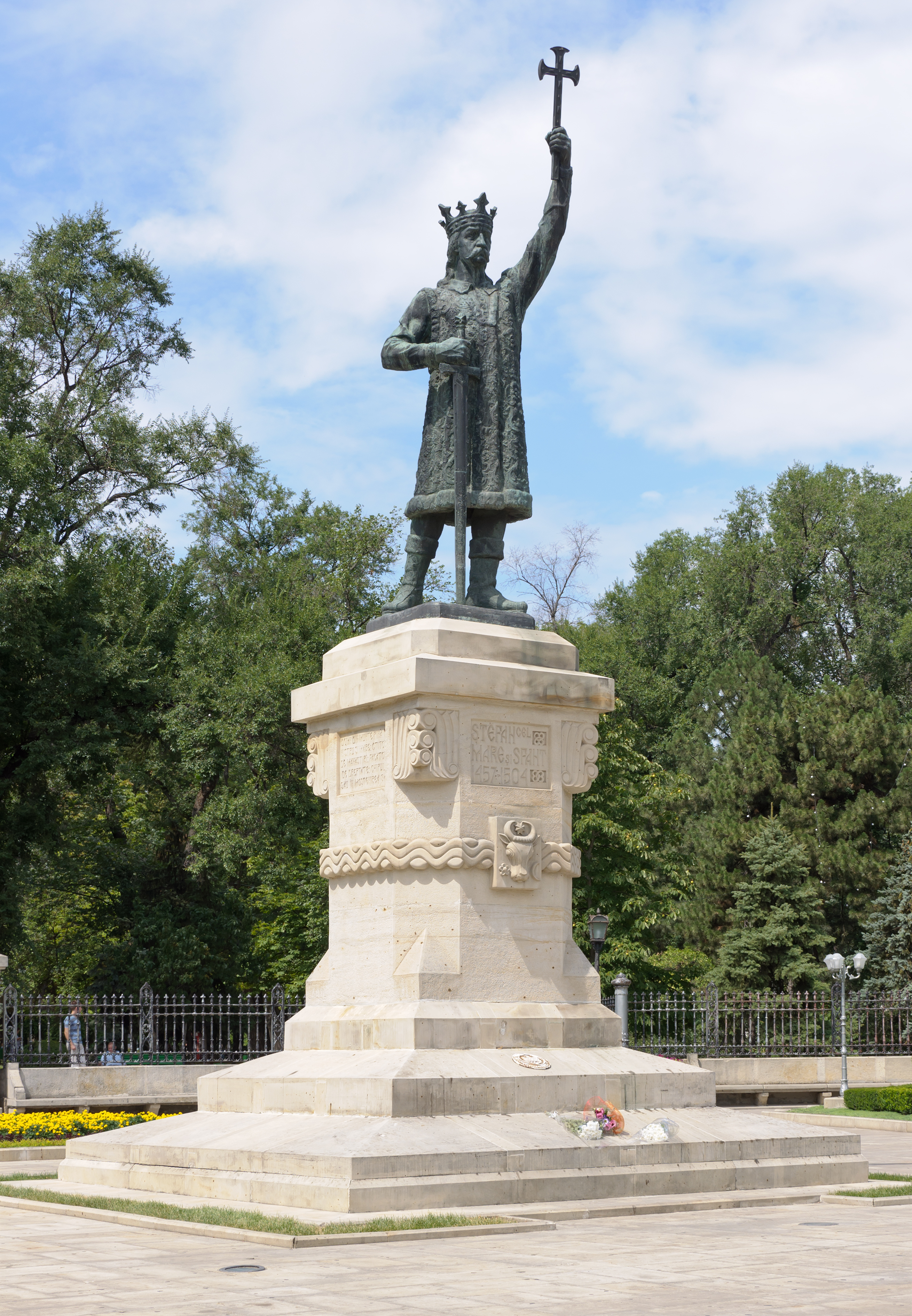
The country's most prominent monument

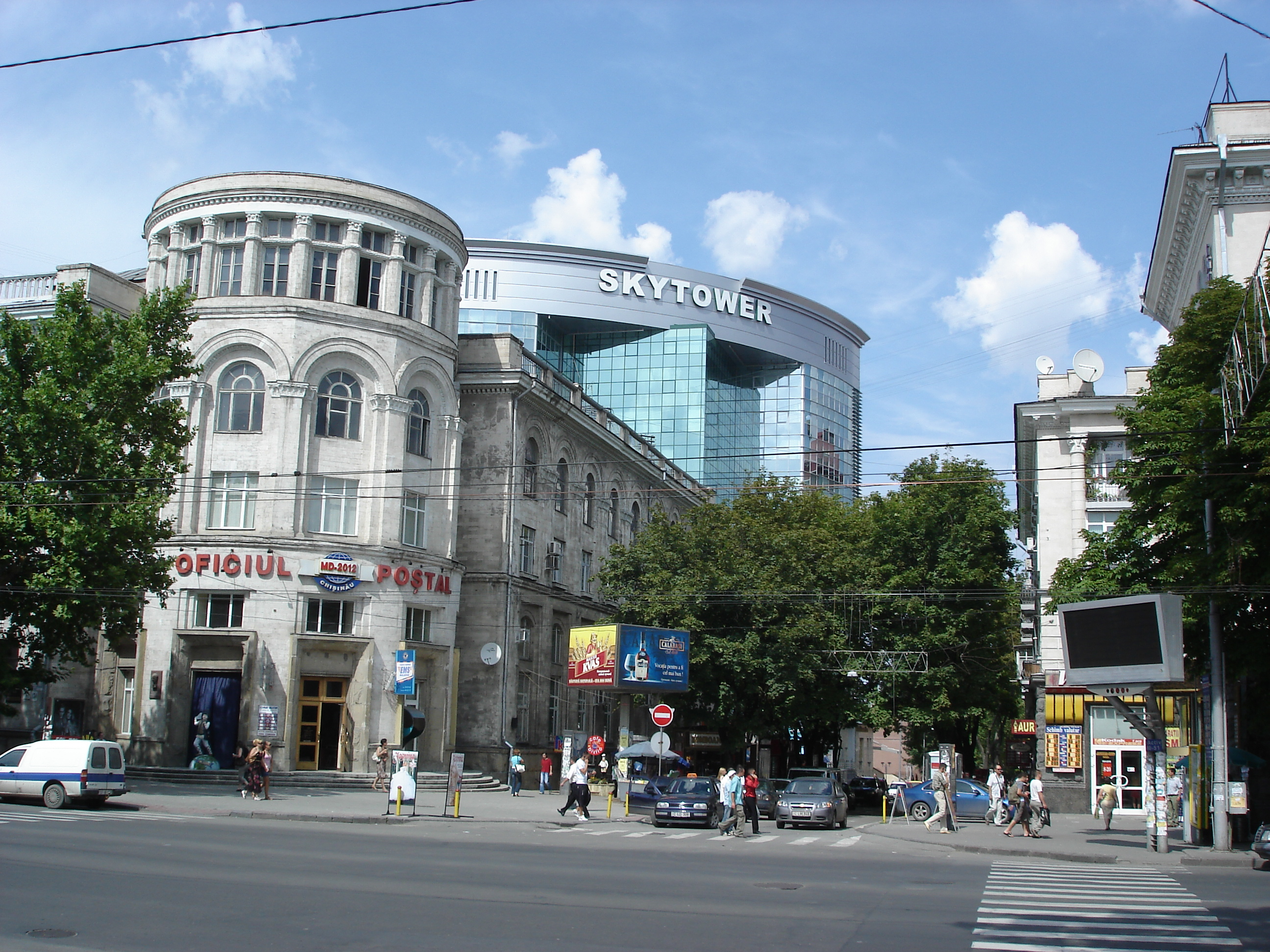
Postal Office and Skytower

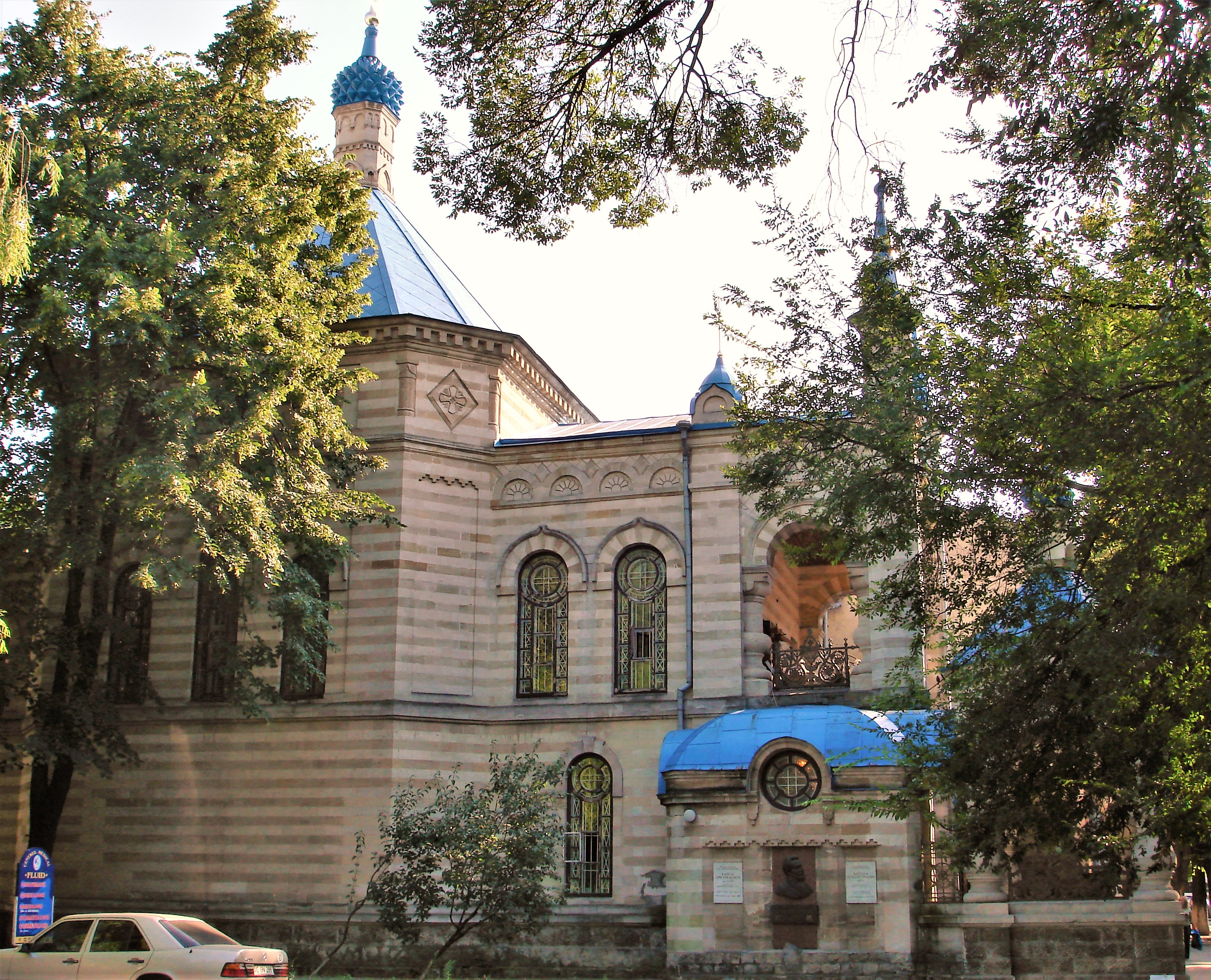
St. Teodora de la Sihla Church

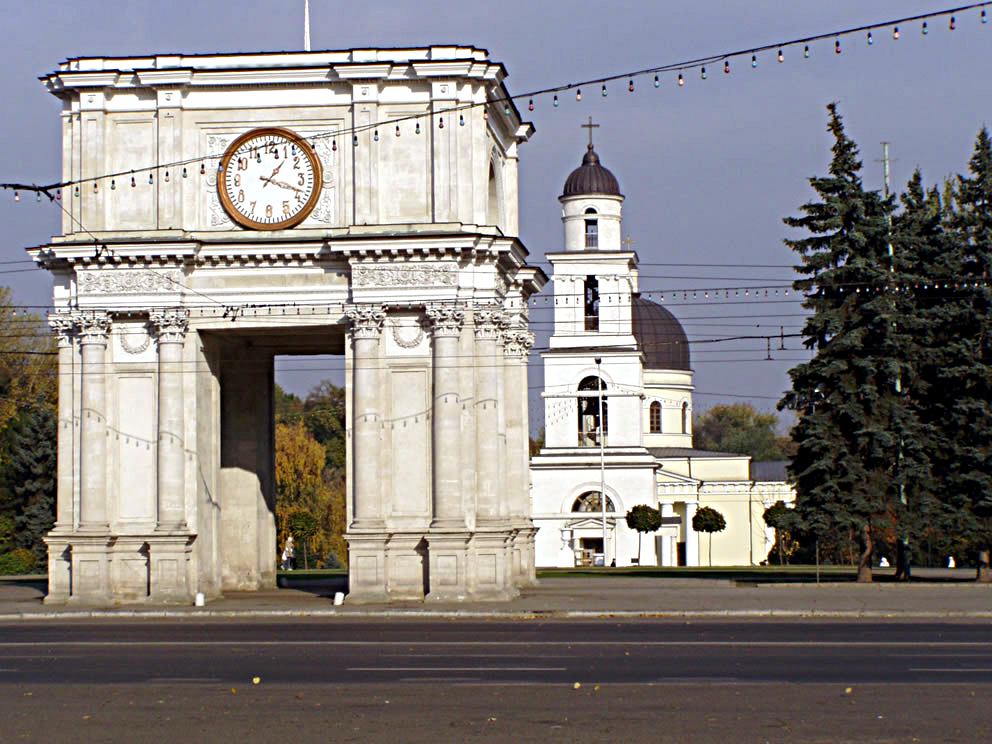
The Triumphal Arch and Nativity Cathedral

Central or Downtown Chișinău is the central business district of Chișinău, Moldova.

=== Overview ===
In central Chișinău are located some governmental and business institutions of Moldova:

- St. Teodora de la Sihla Church
- Embassy of Austria, Chișinău

=== Monuments and memorials ===
- Monument to Doina and Ion Aldea Teodorovici
- Memorial to victims of Stalinist repression

== Gallery ==
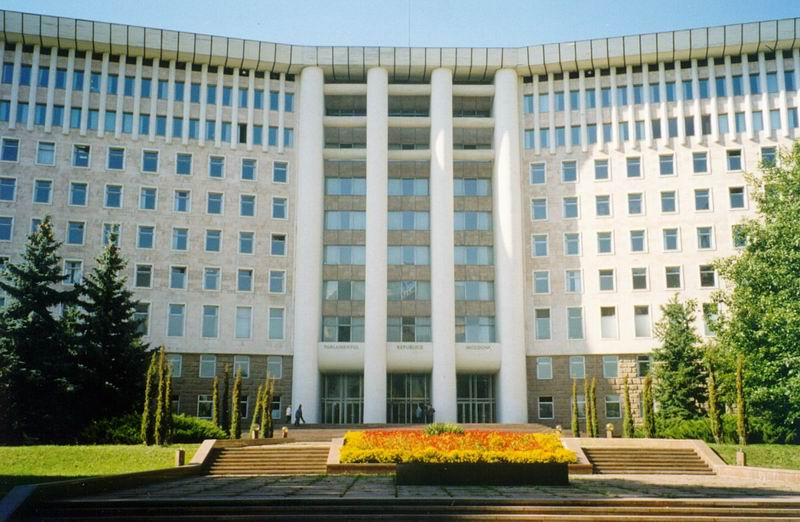
The Parliament

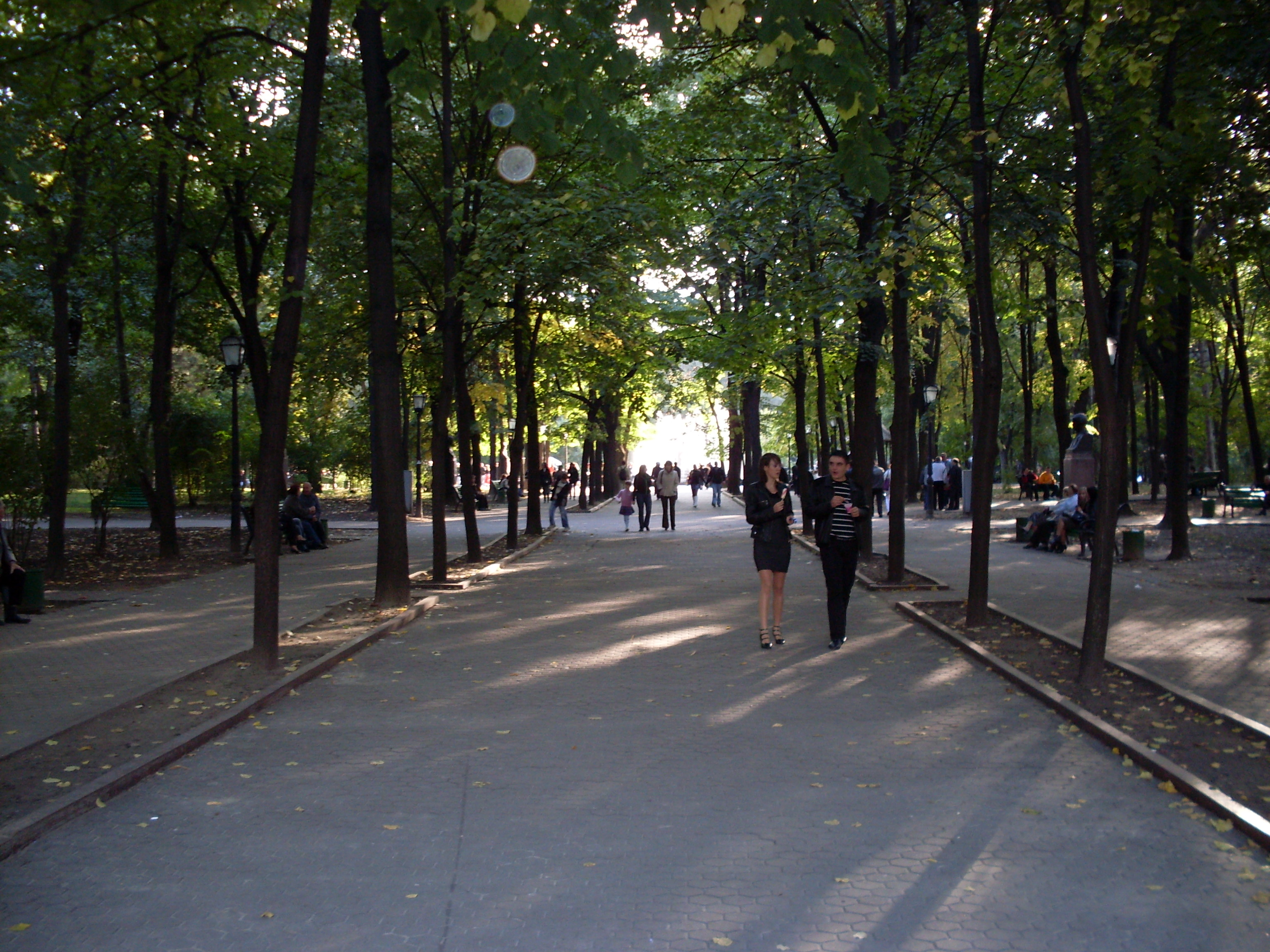
Alley of Classics, Chișinău

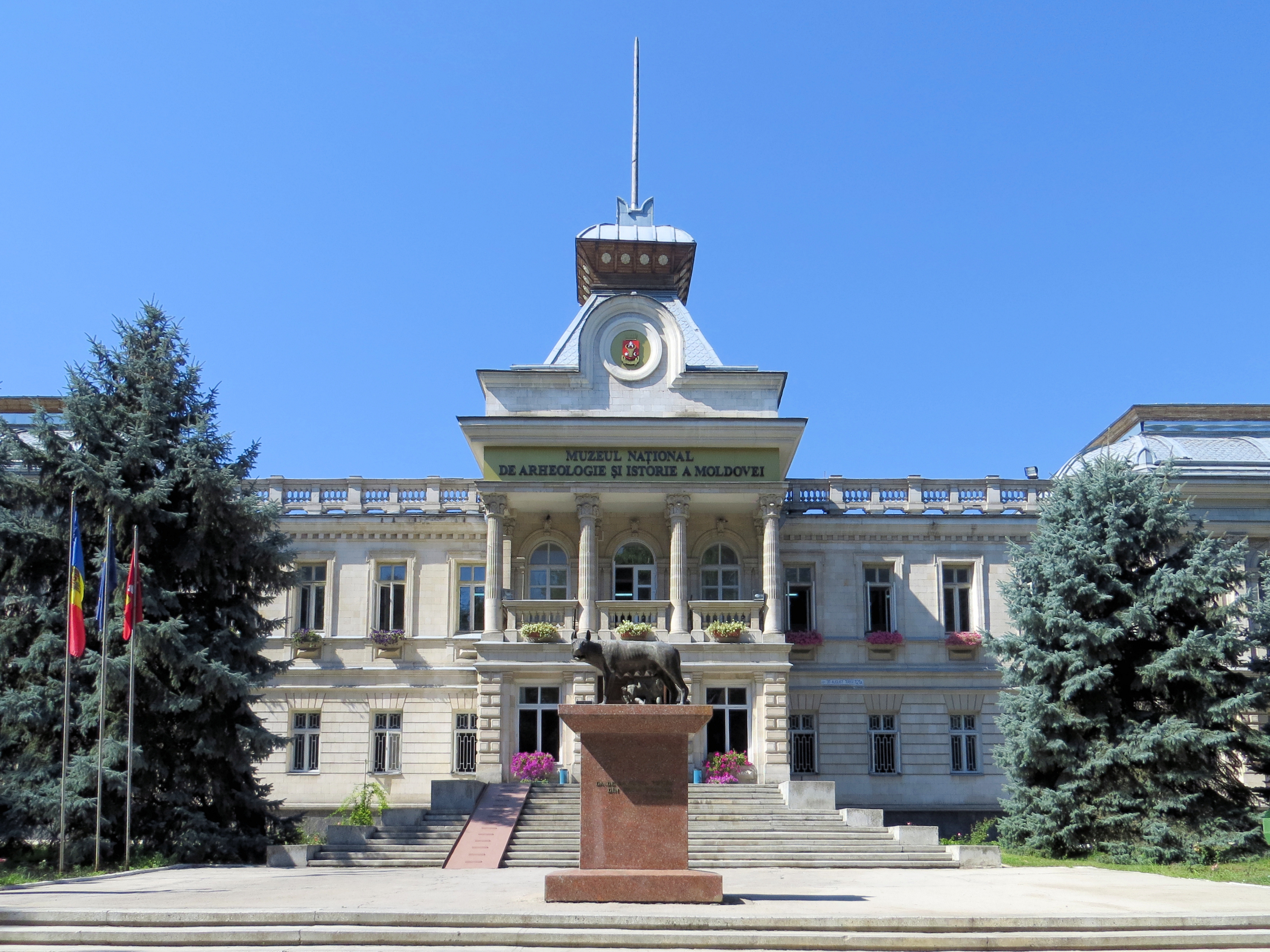
The Capitoline Wolf and National History Museum

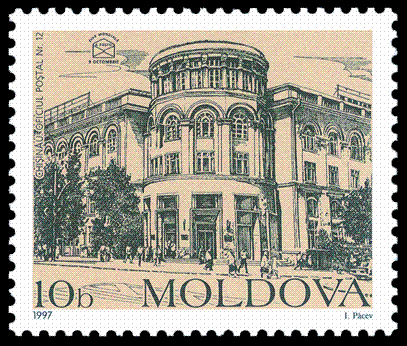

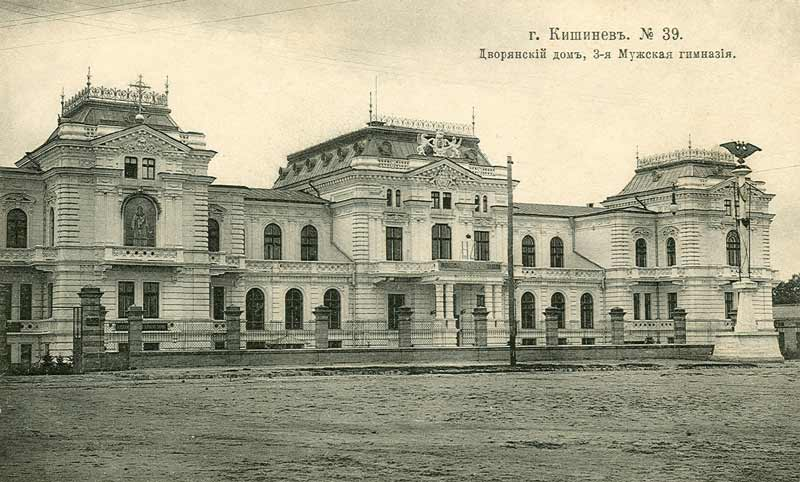
Sfatul Țării Palace
