= Chișinău Water Tower =

Architectural monument in Chișinău, Moldova

Coordinates: 47°1′9.5″N 28°49′20″E

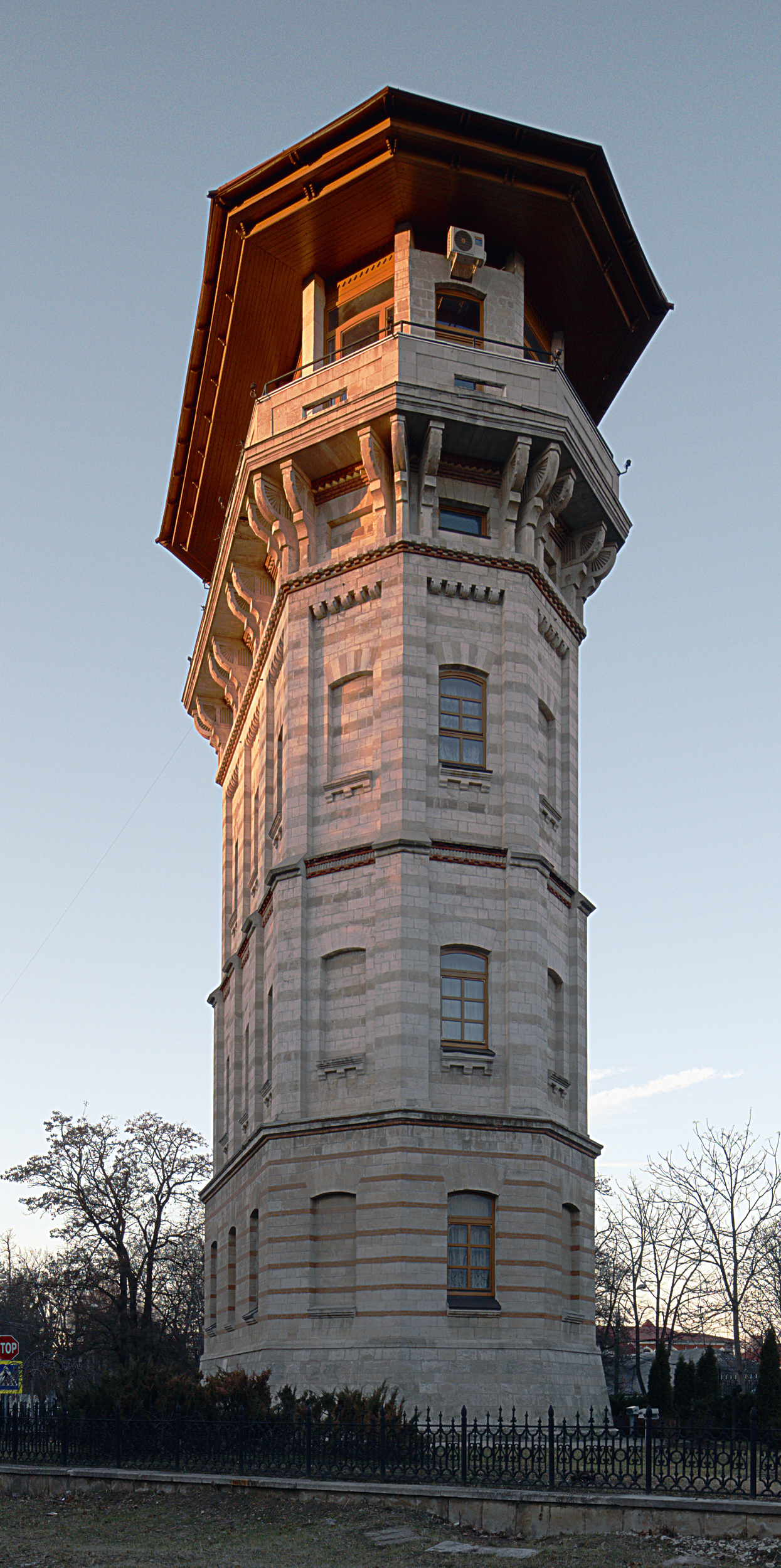
The water tower seen from east

The Chișinău Water Tower (Romanian: Turnul de apă din Chișinău) is an architectural monument of Chișinău, Moldova, located at 2 Mitropolit Bănulescu-Bodoni Street and built at the end of 19th century after a project by Alexander Bernadazzi. It was a main part of Chișinău's water system. The upper level was built of wood and was destroyed by an earthquake. It was rebuilt between 1980 and 1983. It currently hosts Chișinău City museum, which contains items dating from 15th to 20th centuries. The upper level is a space for exhibitions of both legacy and modern paintings and photographies, as well as various cultural events.

== History ==
As soon as the tower was completed, the city government opened city's first sewerage network, which had been planned during Carol Schmidt's mayor term. The tower started to serve the central part of the city, with a capacity of approx. 2,000 tonnes of water per day.

It was a water tower until 1940, and starting that year it was a firefighter's building, with the upper level holding a water tank. It was converted into a museum in 1971.

== Structure ==
The tower's height is 22 metres (72 ft). The walls are built of local rock, with some rows of brick. Their width varies from 50 centimetres (20 in) at the upper level to 2 metres (6 ft 7 in) at the bottom. Inside there is a spiral staircase. When the tower was renovated, an elevator was installed. For a short while, the History Museum of Chișinău had its headquarters in this building.

The building suffered significant structural damage during the 1990 Vrancea earthquakes, and was closed for 10 years as a result. The museum opened briefly in 2000, and the tower entered renovation shortly afterwards. The restoration works completed in 2011, with minor improvements in 2013.

A similar tower was built at the crossing of Vasile Alecsandri and Veronica Micle streets, but it does not exist anymore.

== Bibliography ==
- Colesnic, Iurie (1997). Chișinău. Enciclopedie. Chișinău. p. 117.
