= Măzărache Church =

- Biserica Măzărache
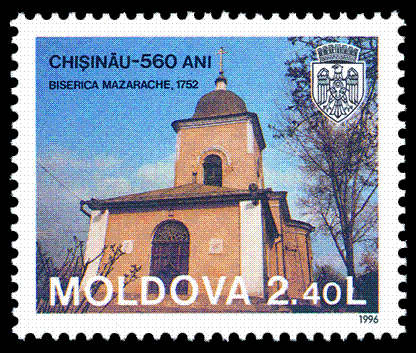
- 1996 stamp
- Măzărache Church
- 47°1′15″N 28°49′49″E
- Location: 3 Mazarache, Chişinău
- Country: Moldova
- Denomination: Eastern Orthodoxy

History
- Status: Church
- Founder: Vasile Măzărachi

Architecture
- Style: Byzantine Style
- Completed: 1752

The Măzărache Church (Romanian: Biserica Măzărache) is a church in Chişinău, Moldova.

== Overview ==
The Măzărache Church is considered to be the oldest in Chişinău, erected by Vasile Măzărache in 1752. It is a monument built according to the typical indigenous medieval Moldavian architecture of the 15-16th centuries; the church was built on the place on a fortress destroyed by the Ottomans in the 17th century.

The stone block marking the location of the water spring that gave name to Chişinău is set at the foot of the hill upon which stands Măzărache Church. The name of the spring - "chisla noua" - is believed to be the archaic Romanian for "new spring".

== Gallery ==
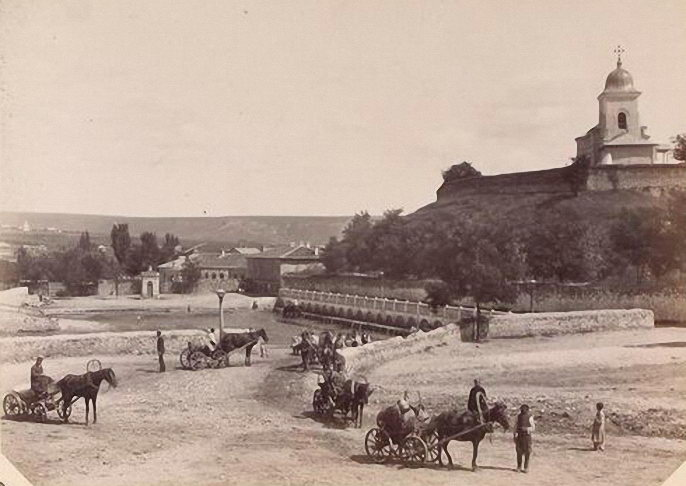
Măzărachi Church in the 19th century
