= Triumphal Arch, Chișinău =

Monument in Chișinău, Moldova

Triumphal Arch
- Arcul de Triumf
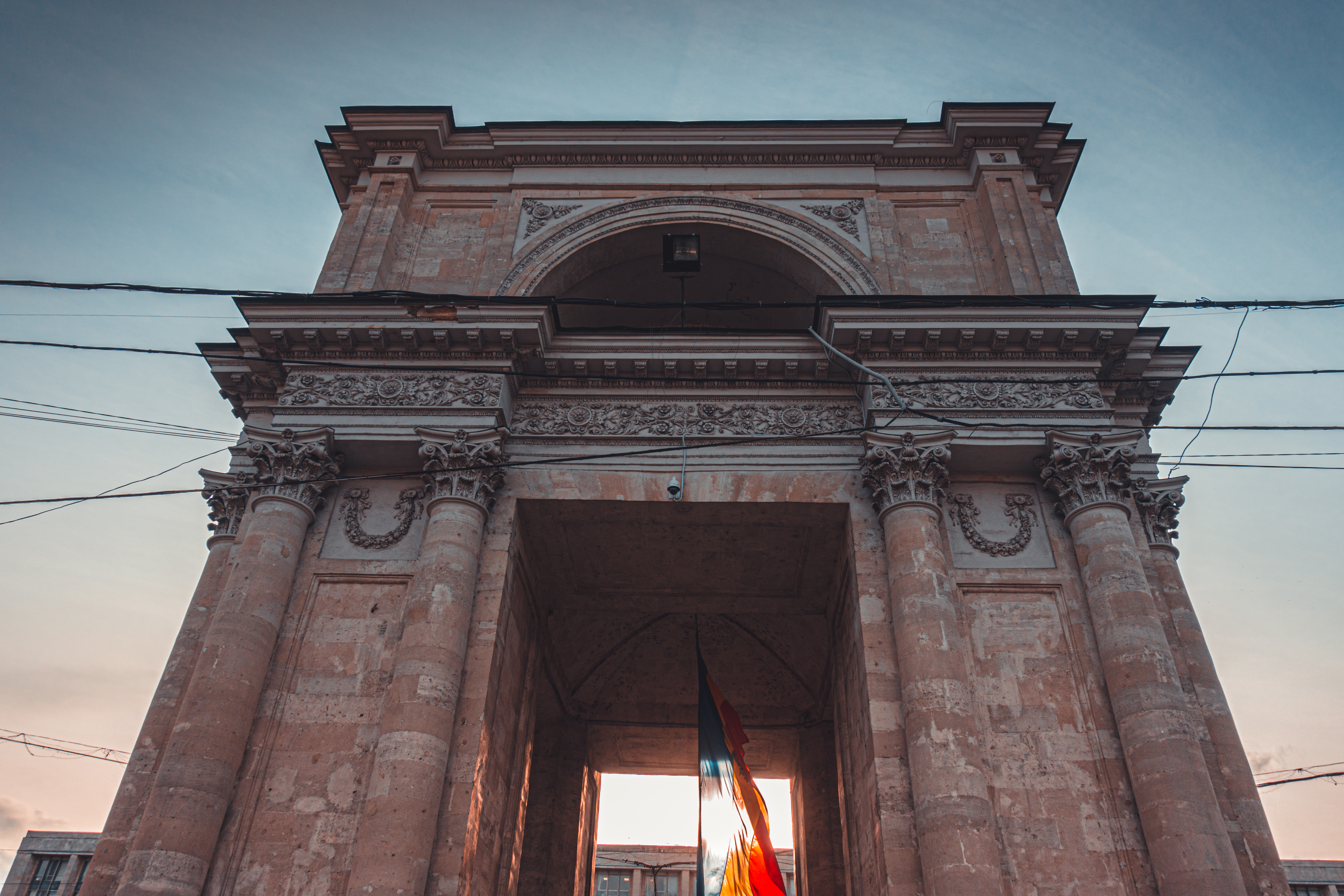
- The arch in 2020
- Interactive map of Triumphal Arch
- Location: Piața Marii Adunări Naționale, Central Chișinău
- Coordinates: 47°1′29″N 28°49′57″E
- Designer: Luca Zaușkevici
- Type: Triumphal arch
- Material: white stone
- Width: 10 metres (33 ft)
- Height: 13 metres (43 ft)
- Beginning date: 1840
- Opening date: 1841
- Dedicated to: Russo-Turkish War

The Triumphal Arch (Romanian: Arcul de Triumf) is a monument situated in Central Chișinău next to the Nativity Cathedral on Piața Marii Adunări Naționale nr. 2 and directly opposite Government House.

== History ==
The Triumphal Arch was built in 1840 by the architect Luka Zauschevic and thanks to the governor's of Bessarabia initiative to commemorate the victory of the Russian Empire over the Ottoman Empire during the Russo-Turkish War (1828–29). From its construction to 2011 the monument sheltered at its second level a huge bell of nearly 6.400 kg (400 Puduri). The building is square in plan and has two levels. The height of the monument is 13 m. The capitals of the four pillars of the building were carved in Corinthian style. The upper level is decorated in a classical style. A mechanical clock is mounted on the front, illuminated at night, but does not sound to announce the exact time. The ornaments and capitals are executed in ceramic.

The first clocks on the arcade appeared in 1842. They were brought from Odesa, and seven years later, a strong wind tore off the dial, and the mechanism worked until 1881 and had to be replaced. The new mechanism was purchased in Austria. The real clock worked without repair until the beginning of the war, when it was hit by the bombings in 1941.

In 1945, plaques were installed on the walls of the Arch with the names of the fighters of the Soviet army and the citizens of Moldova, who fought on the territory of Bessarabia in the Second World War and received the distinction of "Hero of the Soviet Union". The plaques were removed in 1991 after independence.

The triumphal arch in Chișinău is located on the axis of symmetry of the architectural ensemble that also includes the Nativity Cathedral, its bell tower, the Great National Assembly Square and the Government House in Chișinău. It was smelted with the copper of the cannons captured by the Russian forces from the Ottoman Empire. The bell "clopote–velican" was initially made for the cathedral's belfry but happened to be too big for it. Finally it was installed in this arch, which was designed in purpose.

The monument and the mechanism of its clock were fully restored in 1973.

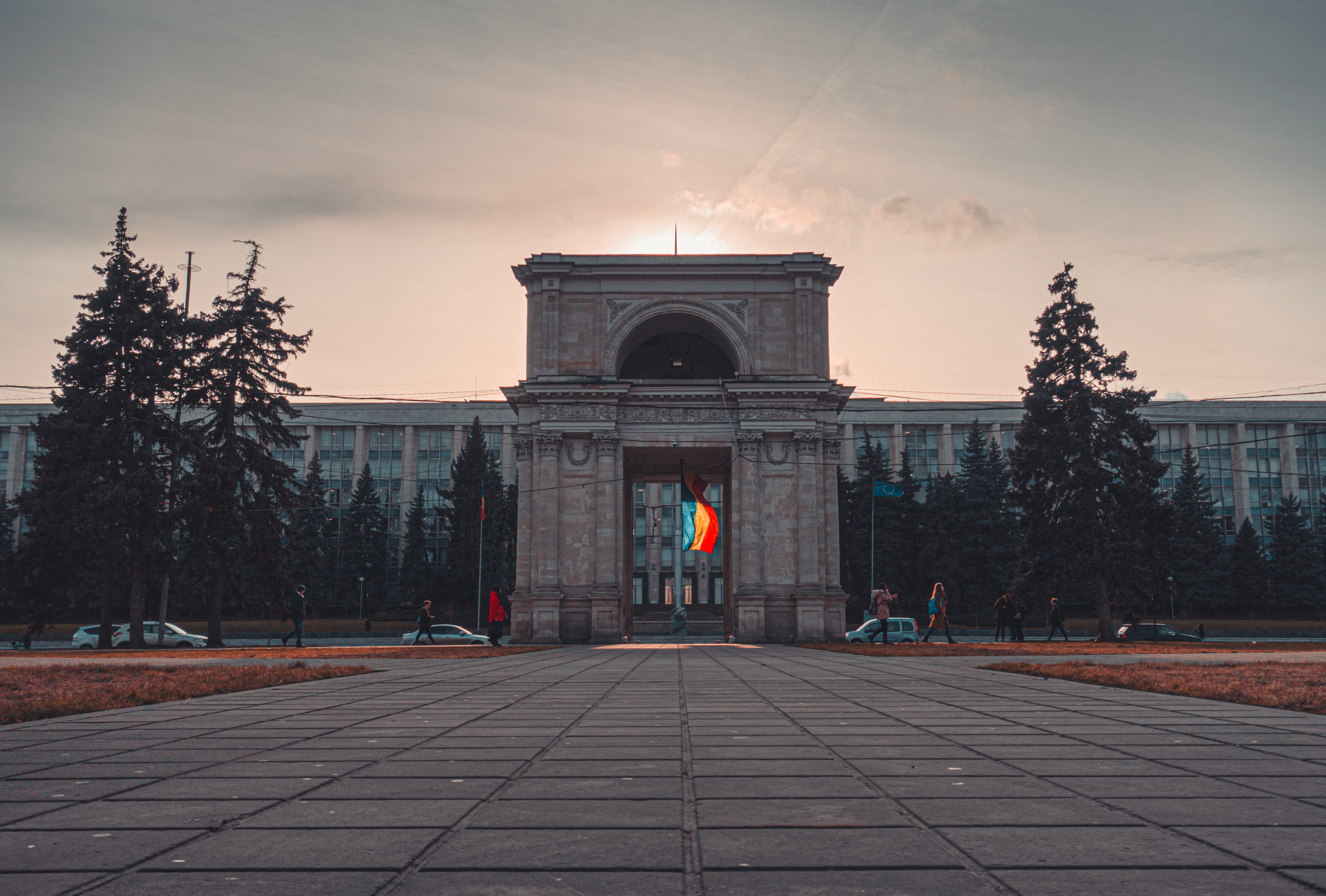

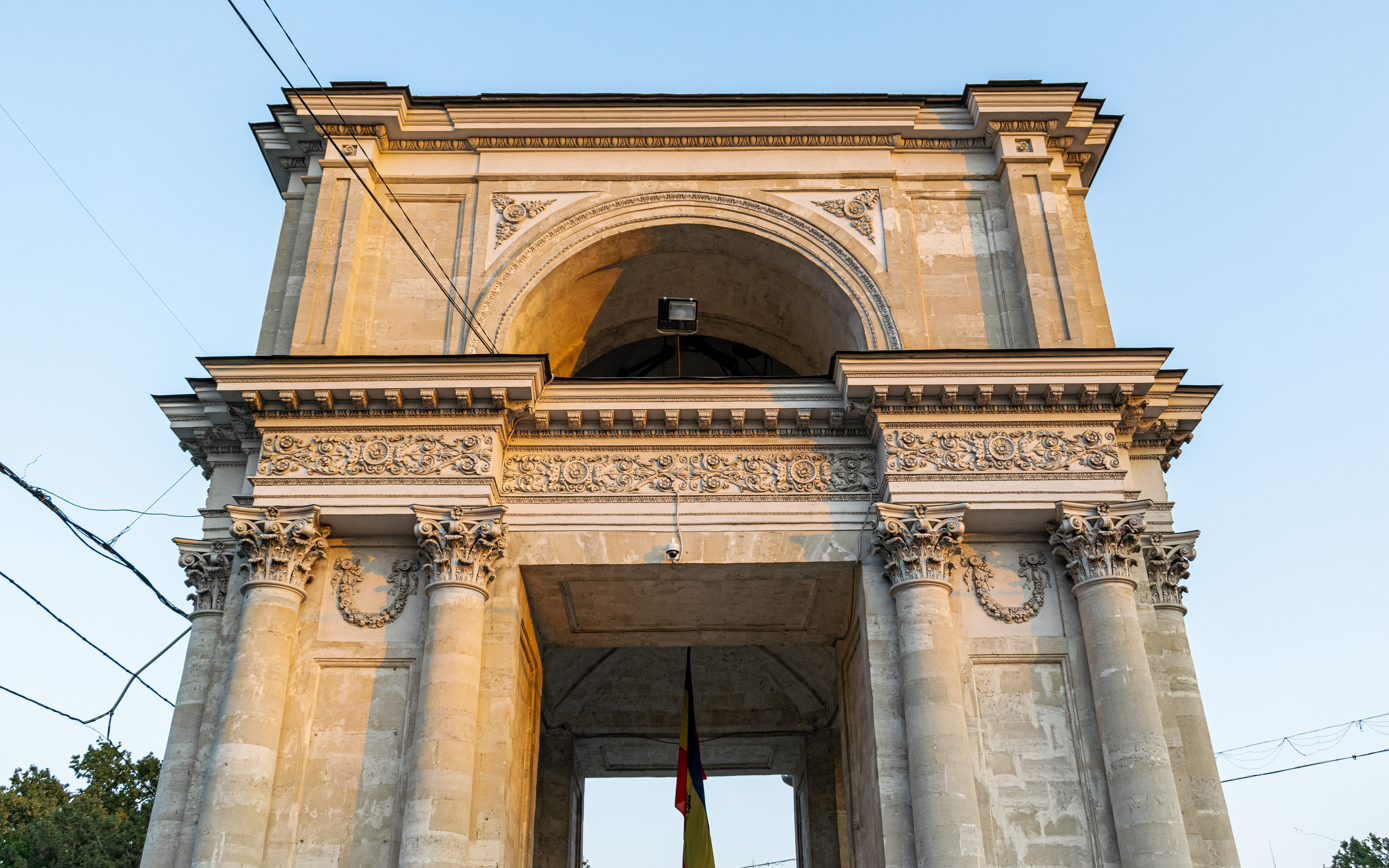

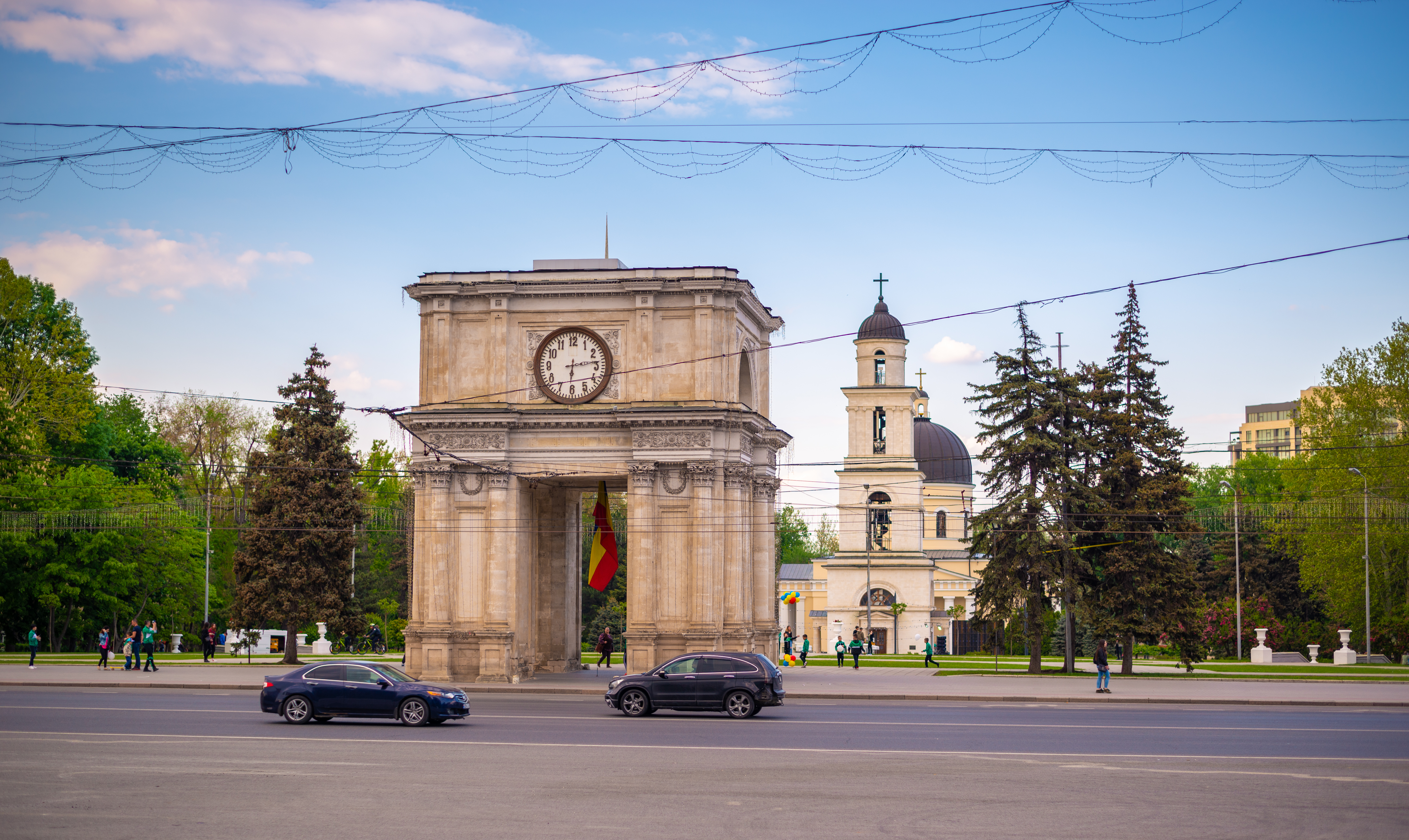
