= Chișinău City Hall =

Monument in Moldova

Coordinates: 47.0230°N 28.8343°E

- Romanian: Primăria municipiului Chișinău
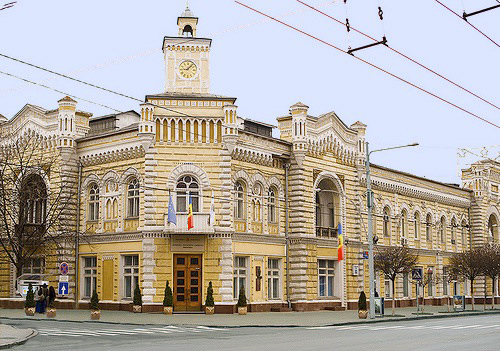
- City Hall of Chișinău
- Interactive map of the Chișinău City Hall area

General information
- Location: 83 Ștefan the Great Avenue, Chișinău, Moldova
- Construction started: 1898
- Completed: 1901
- Client: Municipality of Chișinău
- Owner: Municipality of Chișinău

Design and construction
- Architects: Mitrofan Elladi; Alexandru Bernardazzi

Website
- Official website

Chișinău City Hall (Romanian: Primăria municipiului Chișinău) is a historical and architectural monument built in Italian Gothic style located in Central Chișinău, Moldova. Originally constructed to house the city Duma in 1901, the building was nearly destroyed during World War II. It was rebuilt in the postwar period based on surviving images and construction plans.

== Gallery ==
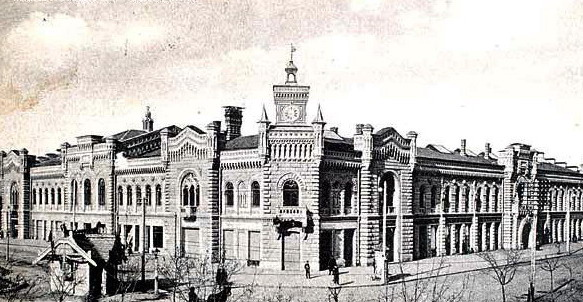
Chișinău City Hall around 1900

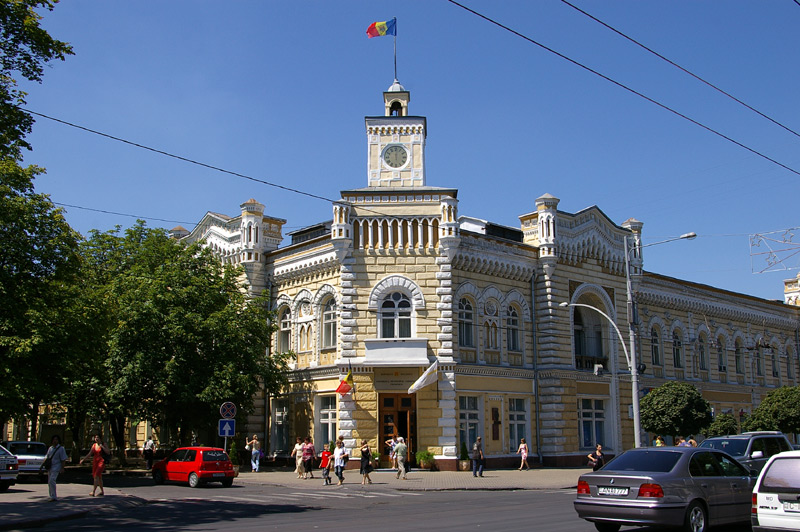
Mairie built in 1817

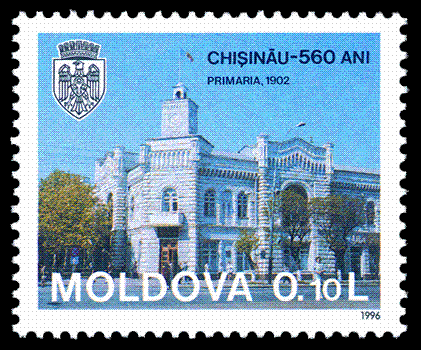
1996 stamp

== See also ==
- Mayor of Chișinău
