= List of monuments in Chișinău =

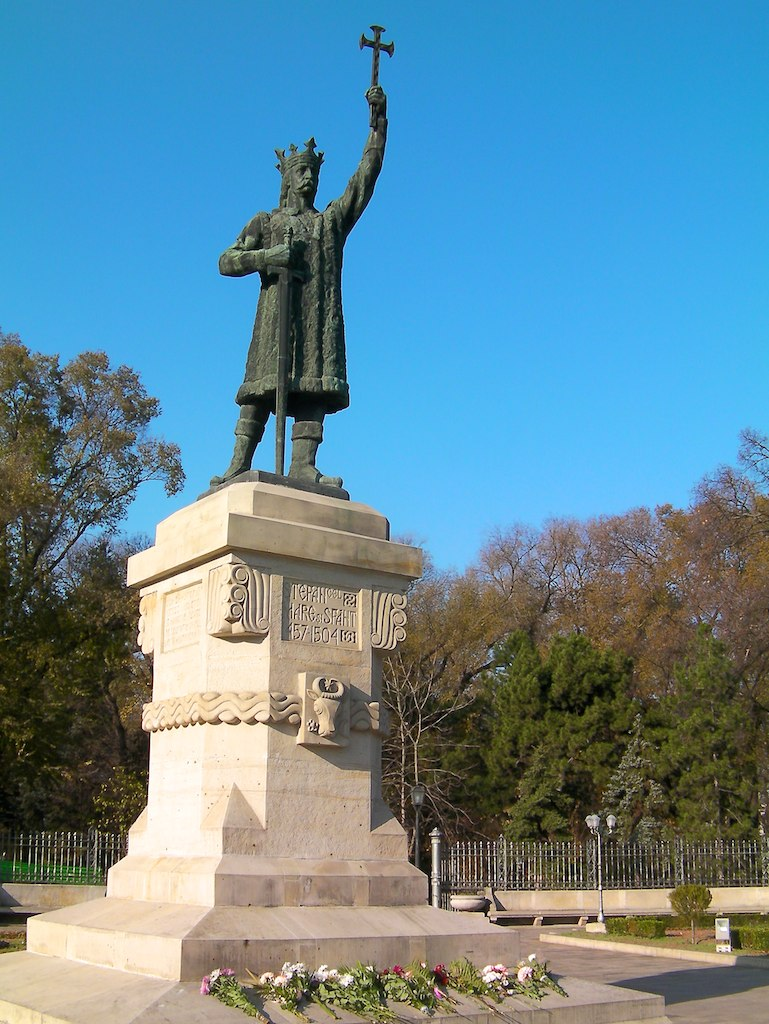
Stephen the Great Monument in Chișinău

This is a list of monuments in Chișinău.

== Alley of Classics ==
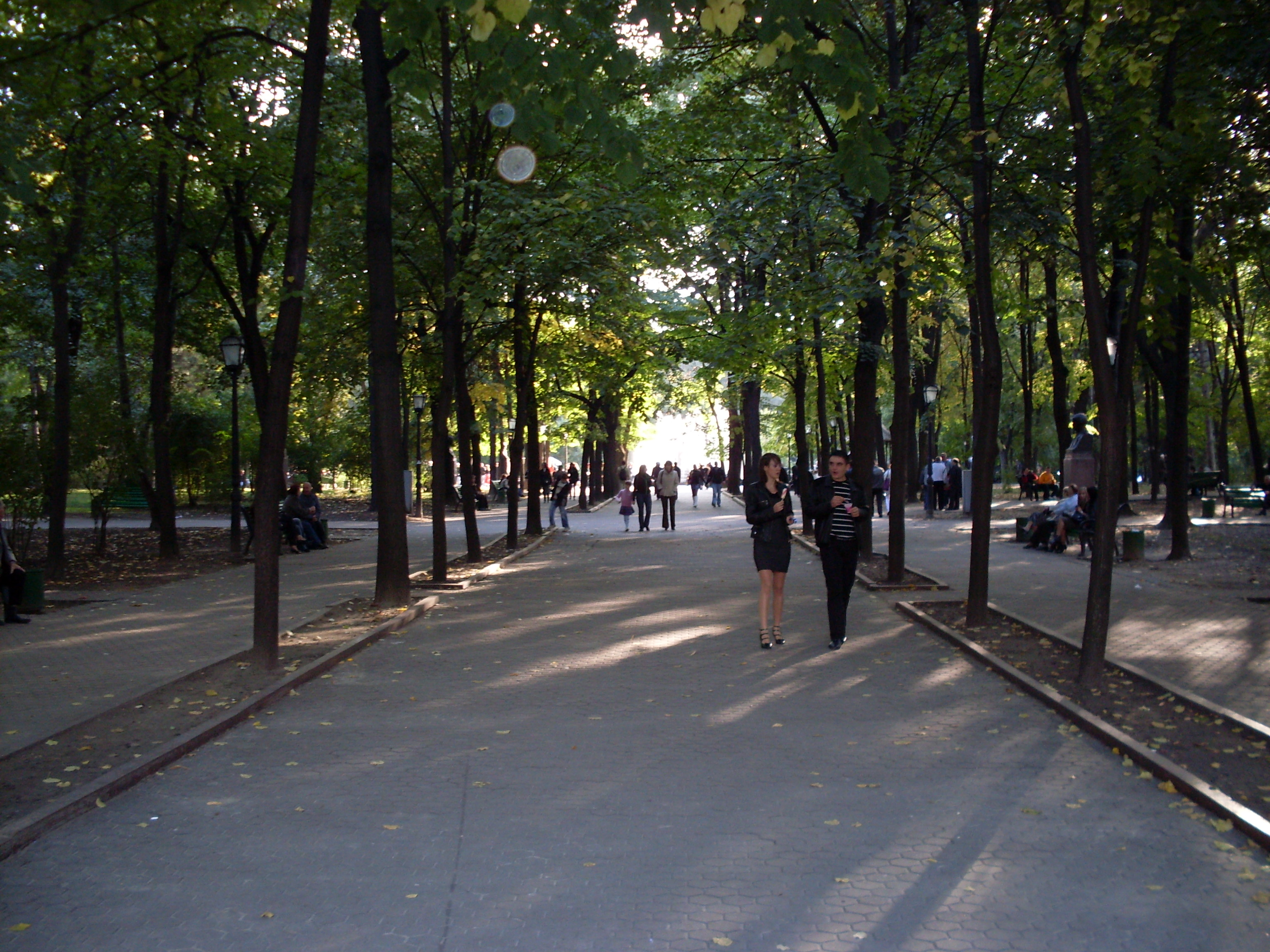
Alley of Classics seen from Ștefan cel Mare Avenue

The Alley of Classics is a sculptural Complex found in Central Park Ștefan cel Mare Chișinău. It contains busts made of red granite dedicated to writers of Romanian literature and politicians of Moldova.

== Chișinău City Hall ==
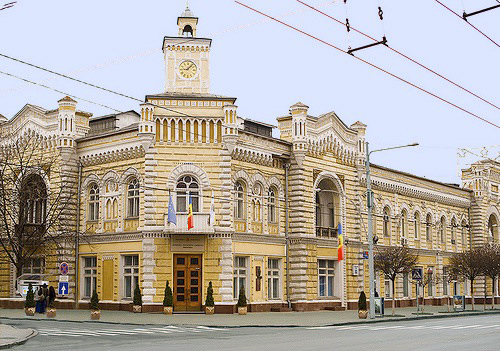
Chişinău City Hall

The Chișinău City Hall was built between 1898 and 1901 by architects Mitrofan Elladi and Alexandru Bernardazzi in the Italian Gothic style.

== Măzărache Church ==
The Măzărache Church is considered to be the oldest church found in Chișinău. It is a monument built according to the typical indigenous medieval Moldavian architecture of the 15-16th centuries; the church was built on the place on a fortress destroyed by the Ottomans in the 17th century.

== Stephan the Great's statue ==
The monument of Ștefan cel Mare's monument from Chișinău was built by sculptor Alexandru Plămădeală (1888-1940) and architect Alexandru Bernardazzi. The monument was inaugurated in 1927 in Public Garden of Chișinău.

== Vasile Alecsandri's monument ==
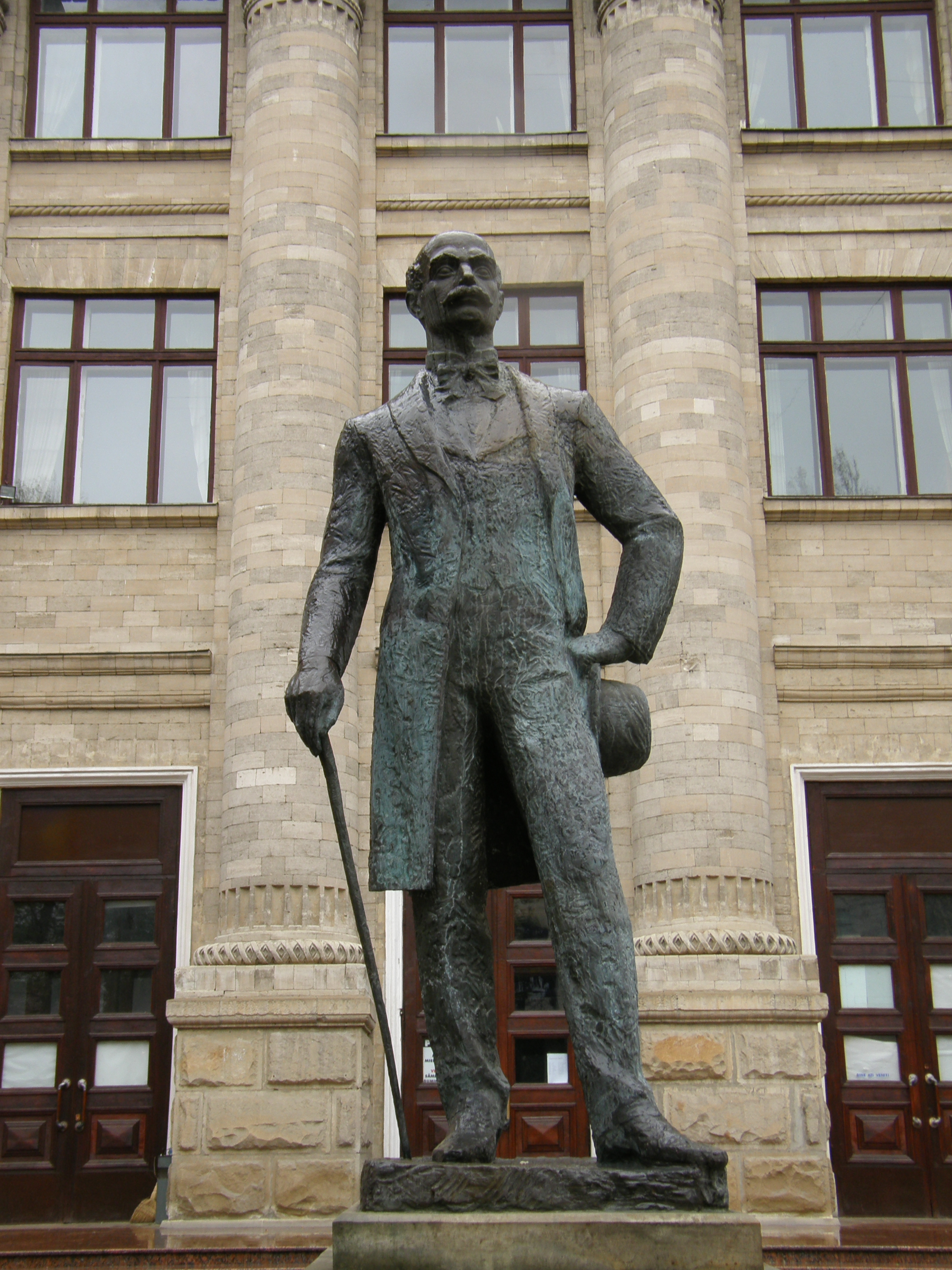
Vasile Alecsandri's statue in front of National Library of Moldova.

Dedicated to classic poet and dramatist of Romanian literature Vasile Alecsandri. It is made from bronze and is situated in front of the National Library of Moldova.

== Ion and Doina Aldea-Teodorovici's monument ==
Dedicated to Emeritus Artists of the Republic of Moldova Ion and Doina Aldea-Teodorovici.

== Ion Creangă's monument ==
Dedicated to the writer of classical Romanian literature Ion Creangă. It was installed in 1982 at Pedagogical University of Chișinău.

== Capitoline Wolf from Chișinău ==
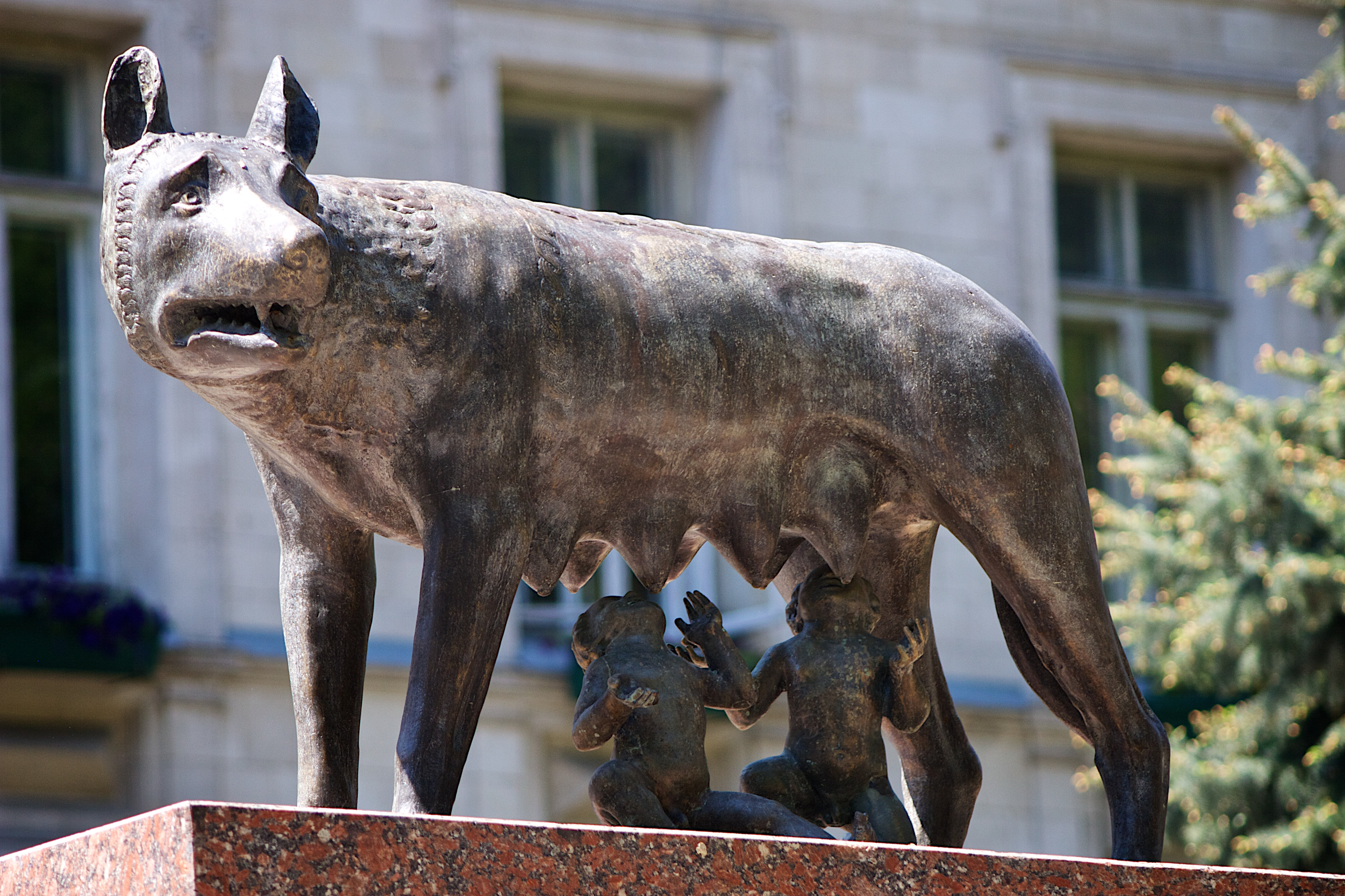
Capitoline Wolf

Capitoline Wolf (Lupa Capitolina) from Chișinău, was given by the municipality of Rome in first years after union of Bessarabia and Bucovinei with România, respective in 1921 and was installed in front of building country advice. In time of Soviet occupation was melted, find treated like symbol of imperialism. After first years of independence a Republica Moldova was installed a companion in front of “History museum of Republica Moldova” from Chișinău, which once with coming to power of Communist Faction from Moldova, was removed. In 2009 was reinstalled a second companion at one time with coming to power Alliance for European integration.

== Semigradov Palace ==
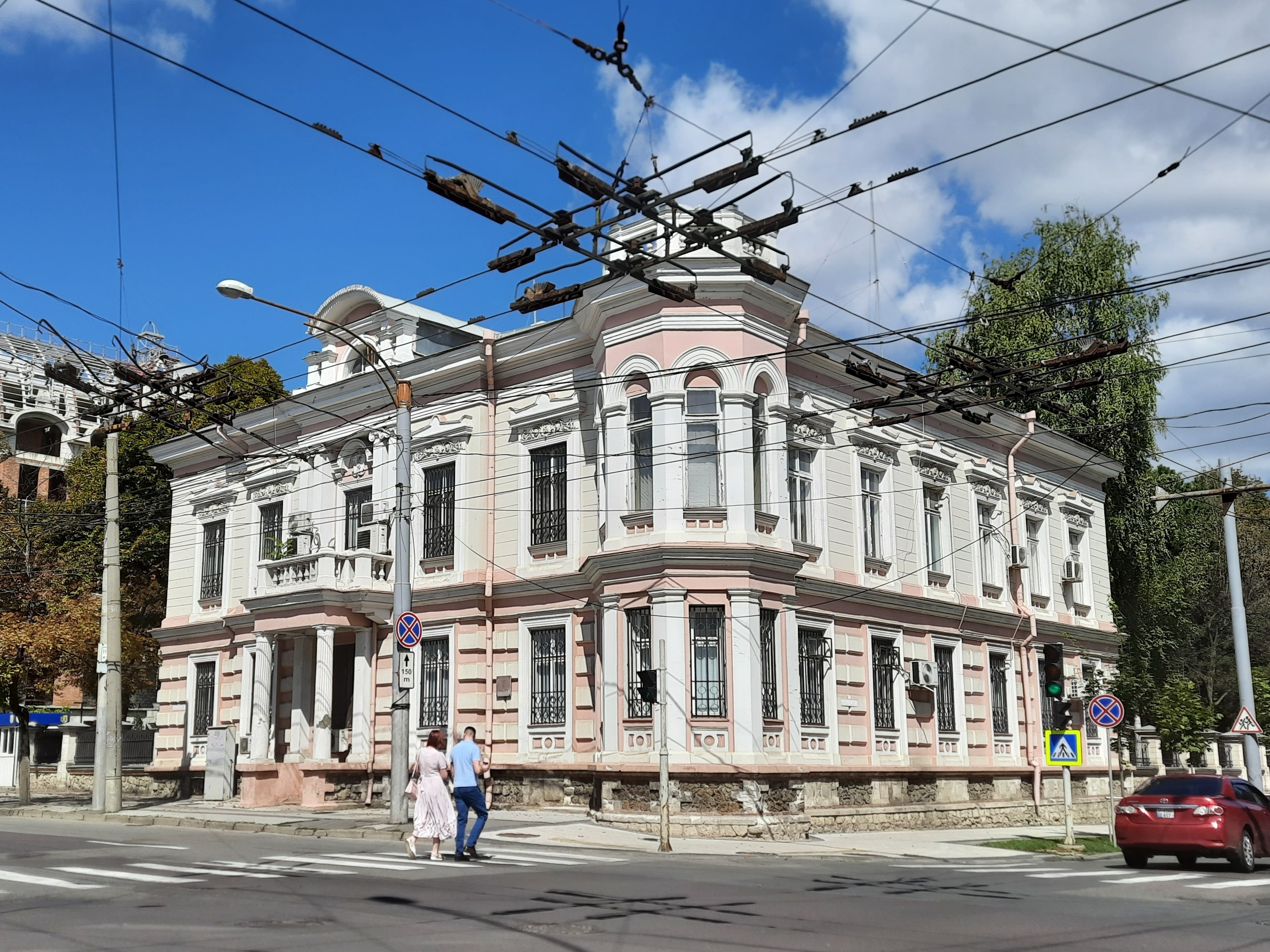
Semigradov Palace

Built between 1873 and 1875.

== Grigore Kotovski's statue ==
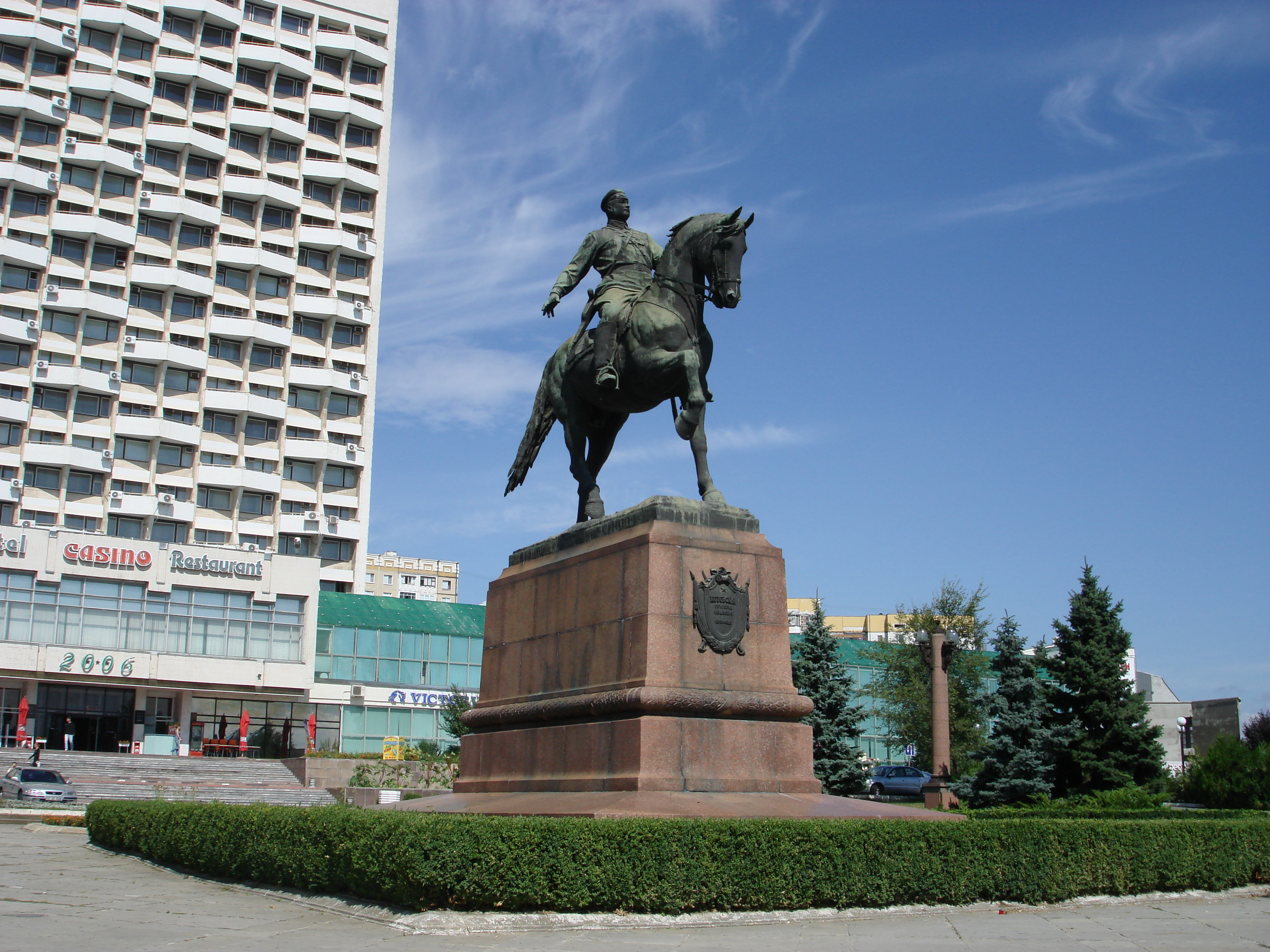
Grigory Kotovsky's statue from Chișinău.

Grigore Kotovski's statue from Chișinău was the first equestrian statue from the Moldavian SSR Soviet period. It is for the Communist hero of civil war from Russia, Grigore Kotovski.

- geographic coordinates: 47°0′49″N 28°51′18″E

== Memorial Complex Eternity ==
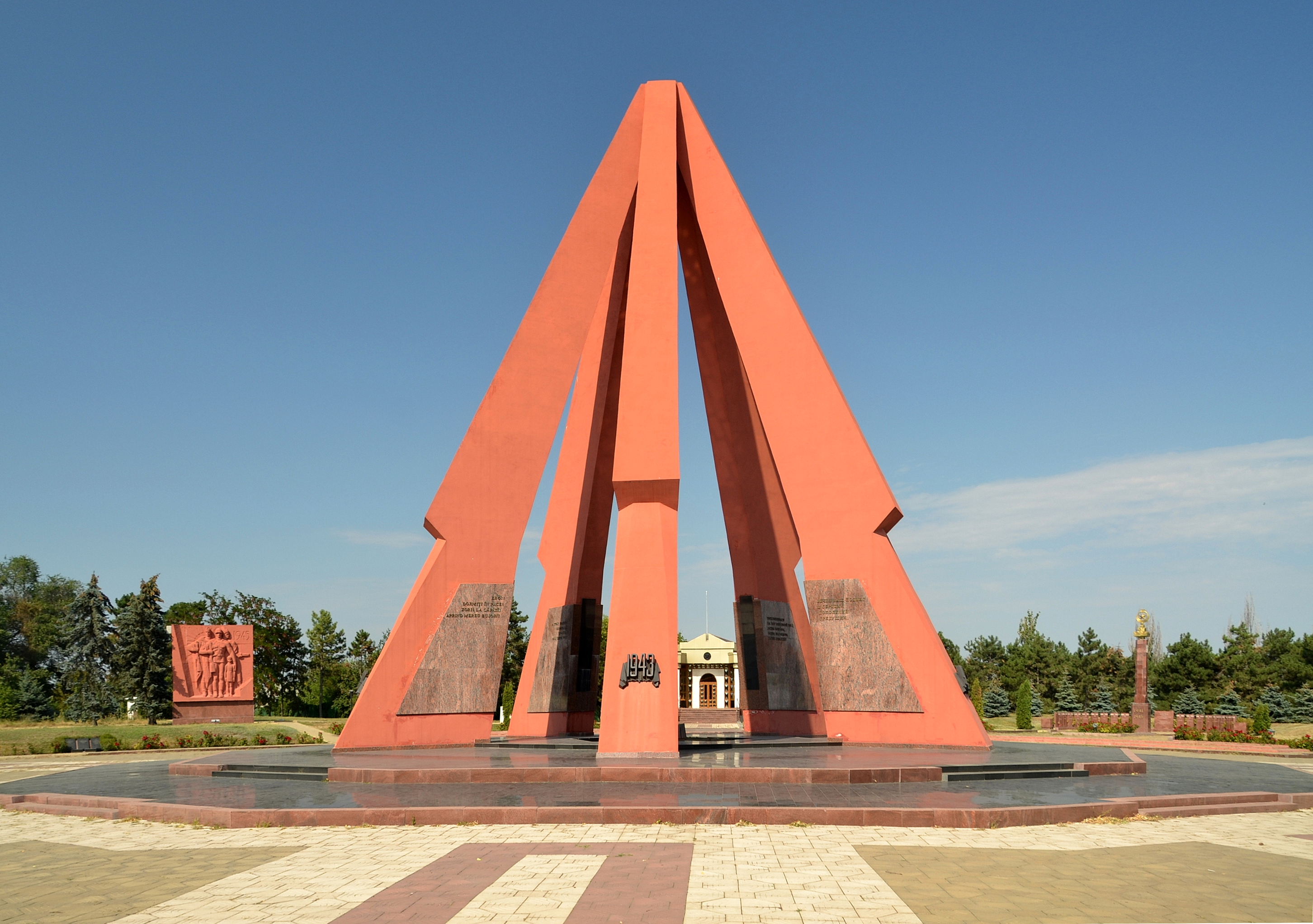
Eternity Complex

- Eternity Complex was high on 9 May 1975.
- Geografic coordinates: 47°0′31″N 28°49′58″E

== Fighter for Soviet power ==
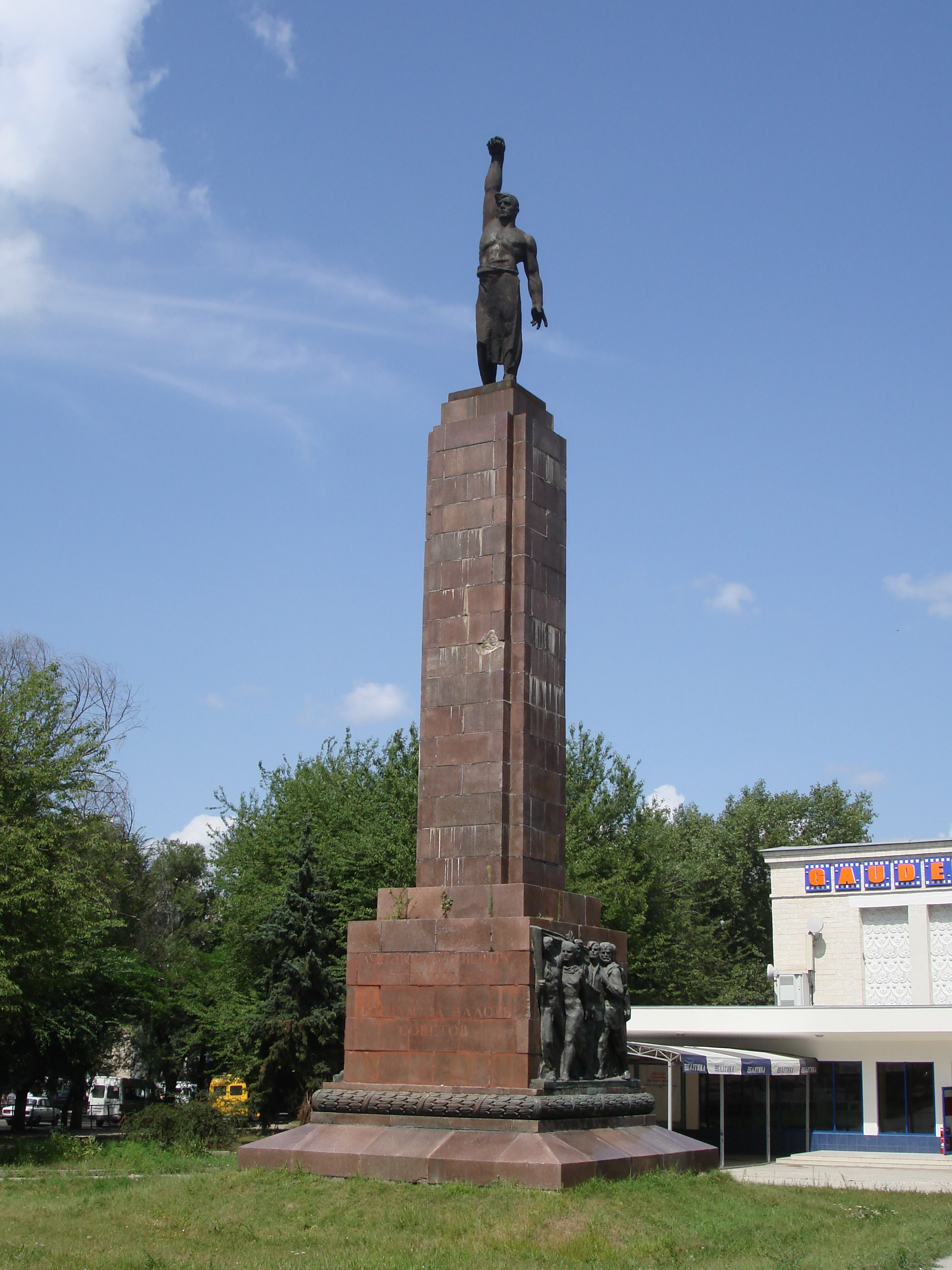
Fighter for Soviet power

- Fight for Soviet power was installed in 1966, in front of Gaudeamus cinema.

Soviet monument. Sculptors: A. Miko, I. Poniatowski, L. Fitov.

- Geografic coordinates: 47°0′27″N 28°49′40″E

== Mikhail Kalinin's monument ==
- Mikhail Kalinin's monument was high in 1977, to lyes way for today.

Soviet monument.

== Lenin's monument ==
Soviet monument. Mounted in the front of Government House in Central Square on 11 October 1949, before the anniversary of 25 years from the creation of Moldovan SSR. In 1991 the monument was moved on the territory of exhibition centre "MoldExpo".

== The "Miorița" Monument ==
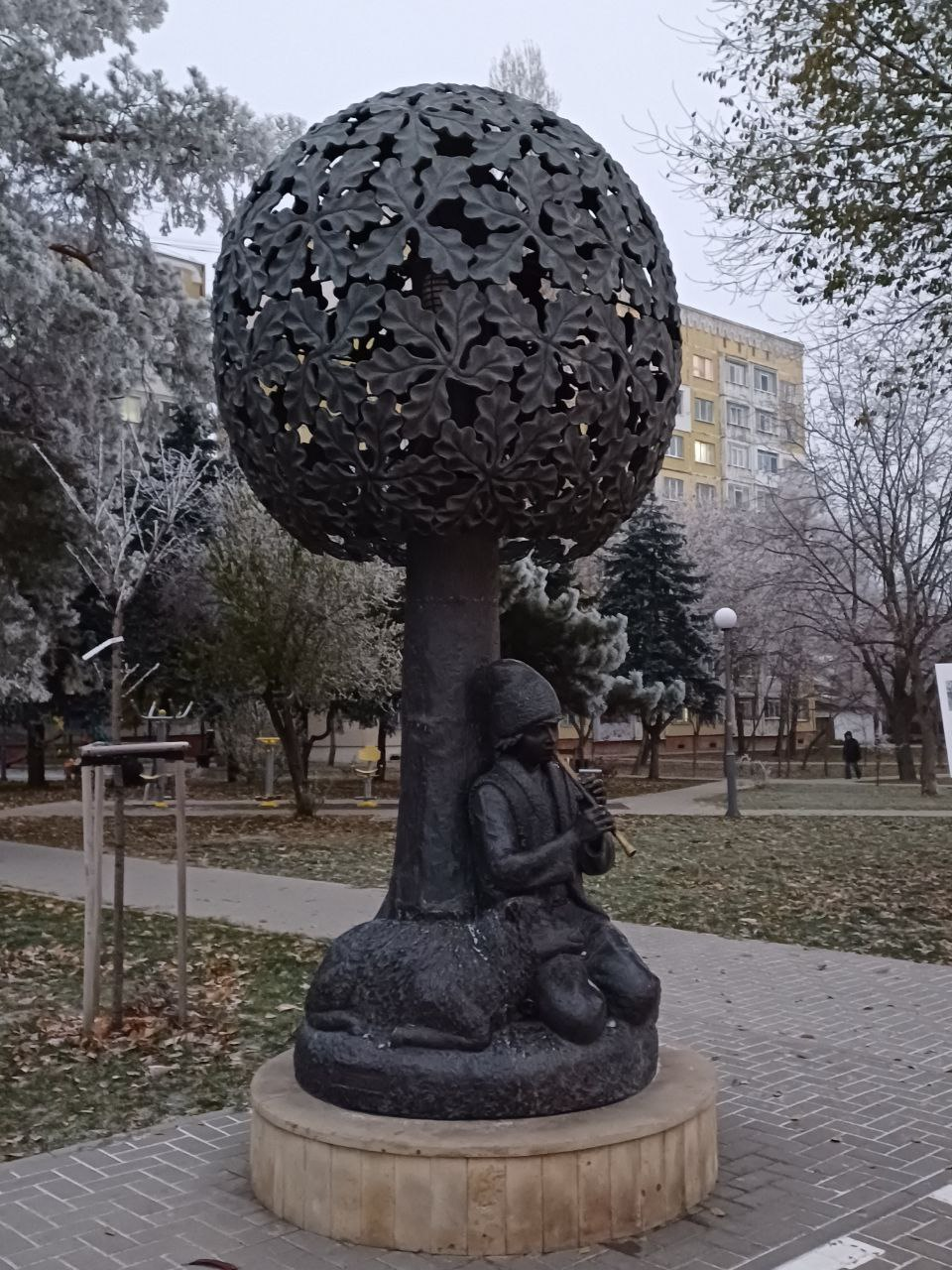
The "Miorița" Monument

The "Miorița" Monument, dedicated to the ballad of the same name, is located in the Centru sector, specifically in the Telecentru neighborhood, within the Miorița Square on Miorița Street. Installed in early March 2022, it has become a significant cultural landmark. The ballad "Miorița" recognized as one of the most important works of Moldovan folklore, holds a special place in the country's cultural heritage, and this monument serves as a worthy embodiment of it.

Description of the Monument

The sculpture depicts a shepherd playing a pipe (fluier) under a tree, with a sheep resting on his knee.

Author

The creator of the "Miorița" monument is Veaceslav Jiglițchi.

== The "Guguță" Monument ==
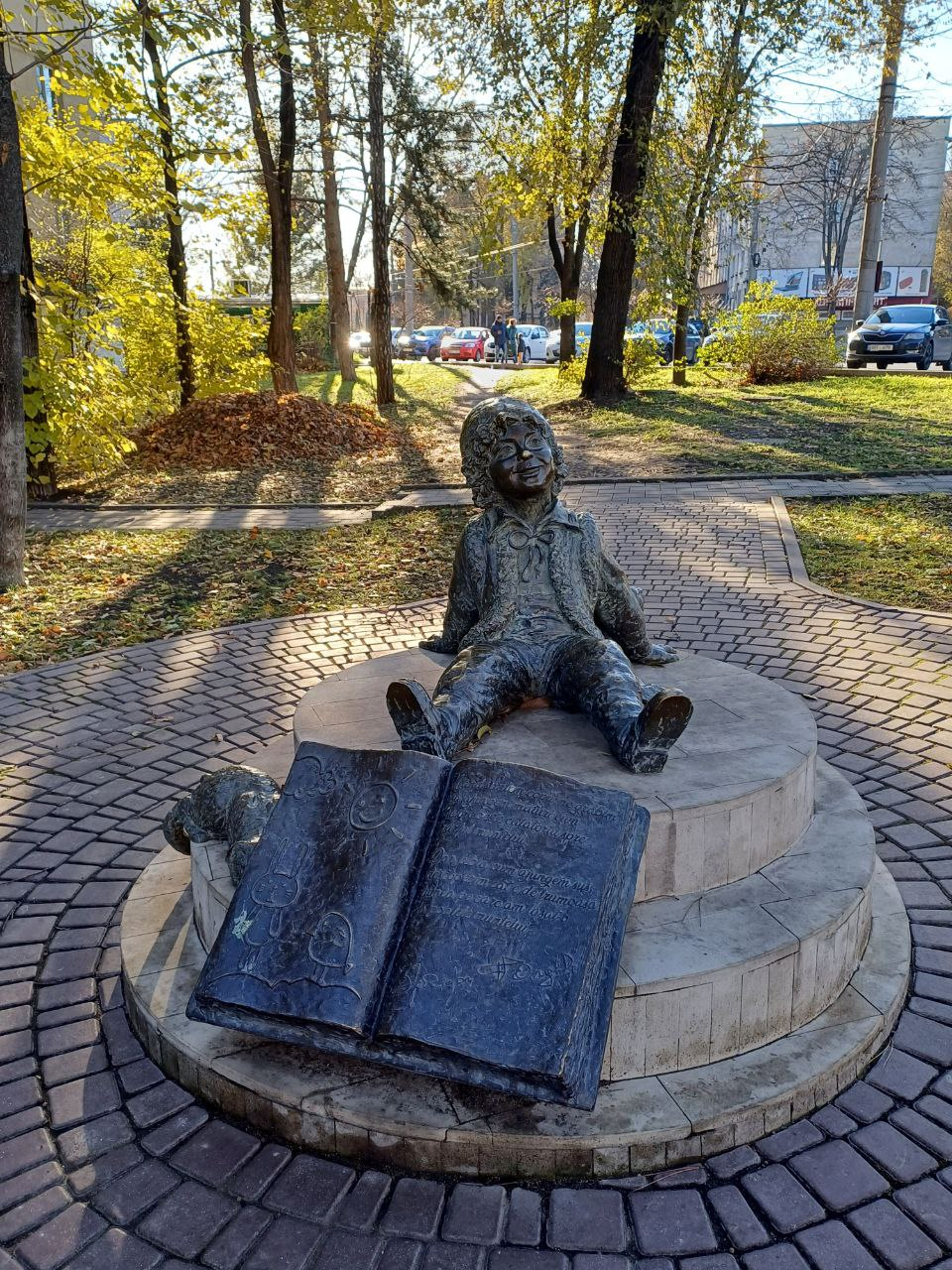
The "Guguță" Monument

The "Guguță" Monument is dedicated to the literary character created by the writer Spiridon Vangheli. Guguță is the protagonist of works such as "The Adventures of Guguță" "Guguță, Captain of the Ship" "Guguță and His Friends" and others. It is located in the Rîșcani sector, in the "Guguță" Square on Kiev Street. The square was opened simultaneously with the unveiling of the monument on May 15, 2021.

Description of the Monument The work is cast in bronze and stands 1.5 meters tall.

Guguță sits on the pedestal; next to him lies an open book featuring a quote by Spiridon Vangheli about childhood and growing up, with a cat hiding behind the book.

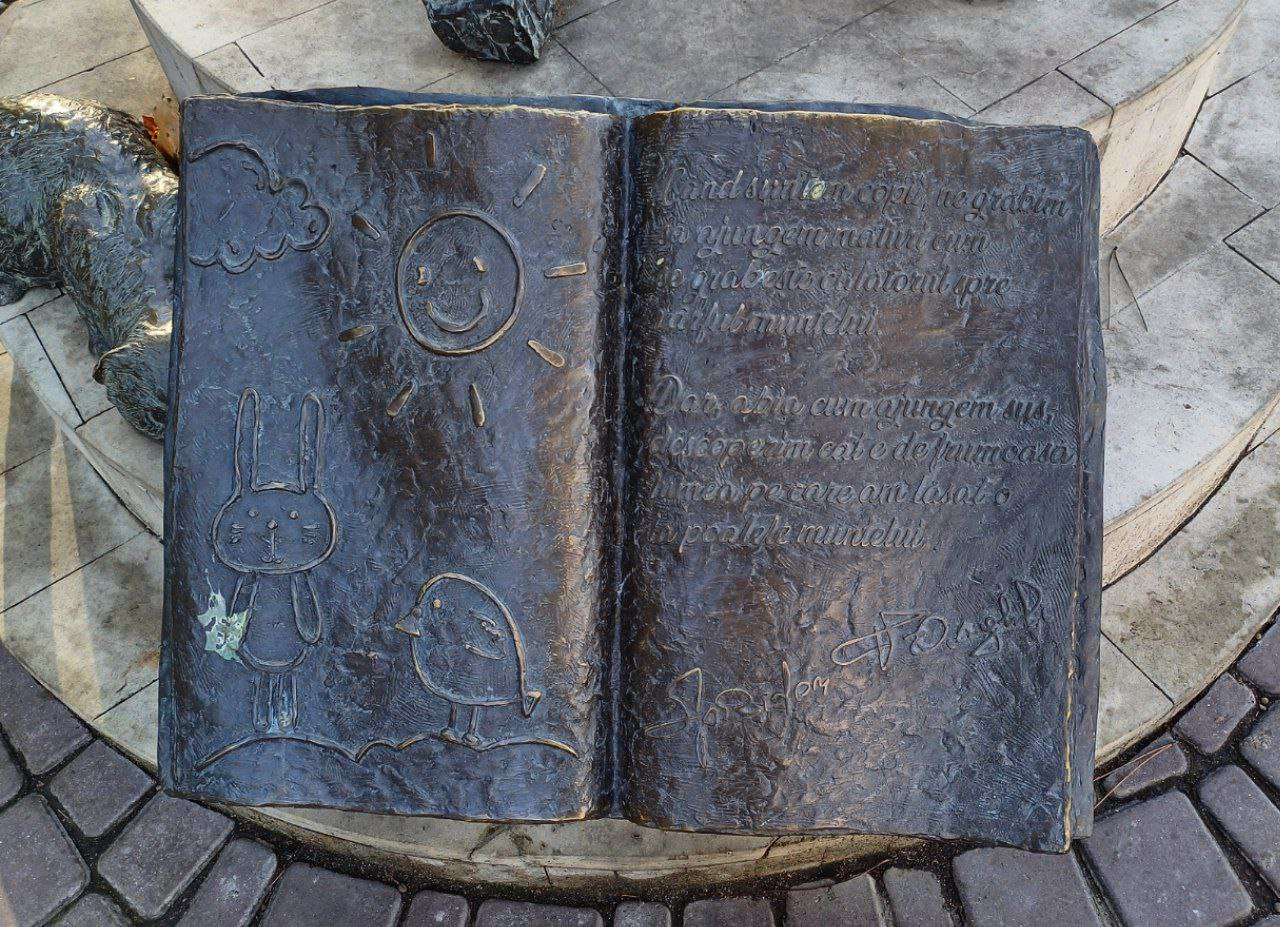
Quote by Spiridon Vangheli

Quote by Spiridon Vangheli (in Romanian):

"Când suntem copii, ne grăbim să ajungem maturi cum se grăbește călătorul spre vârful muntelui.
 Dar abia cum ajungem sus, descoperim cât e de frumoasă lumea pe care am lăsat o la poalele muntelui."

Quote by Spiridon Vangheli (in English):

"When we are children, we hurry to become adults like a traveler rushing to the mountain peak. But only when we reach the top do we discover how beautiful the world is that we left at the foot of the mountain."

The Guguță Square has become a popular leisure spot, frequently visited by mothers and their children.

Author

The creator of the "Guguță" monument is the Moldovan sculptor Veaceslav Jiglițchi.

== Bibliography ==
- Moldova monuments (Chisinau, 1969), p. 10,31
- Vladimir bulat - Lazăr Dubinovschi - in album «Master bassarabian fromcentury XX» (ED.ARC, Chișinău, 2004).
