= Baillayre =

Baillayre is a surname. Notable people with the surname include:

- Auguste Baillayre (1879–1961), French painter
- Tatiana Baillayre (1916–1991), Romanian artist
