= Stephen the Great Central Park =

Public park in Chișinău, Moldova

Coordinates: 47.025°N 28.828°E

- Grădina Publică „Ștefan cel Mare”
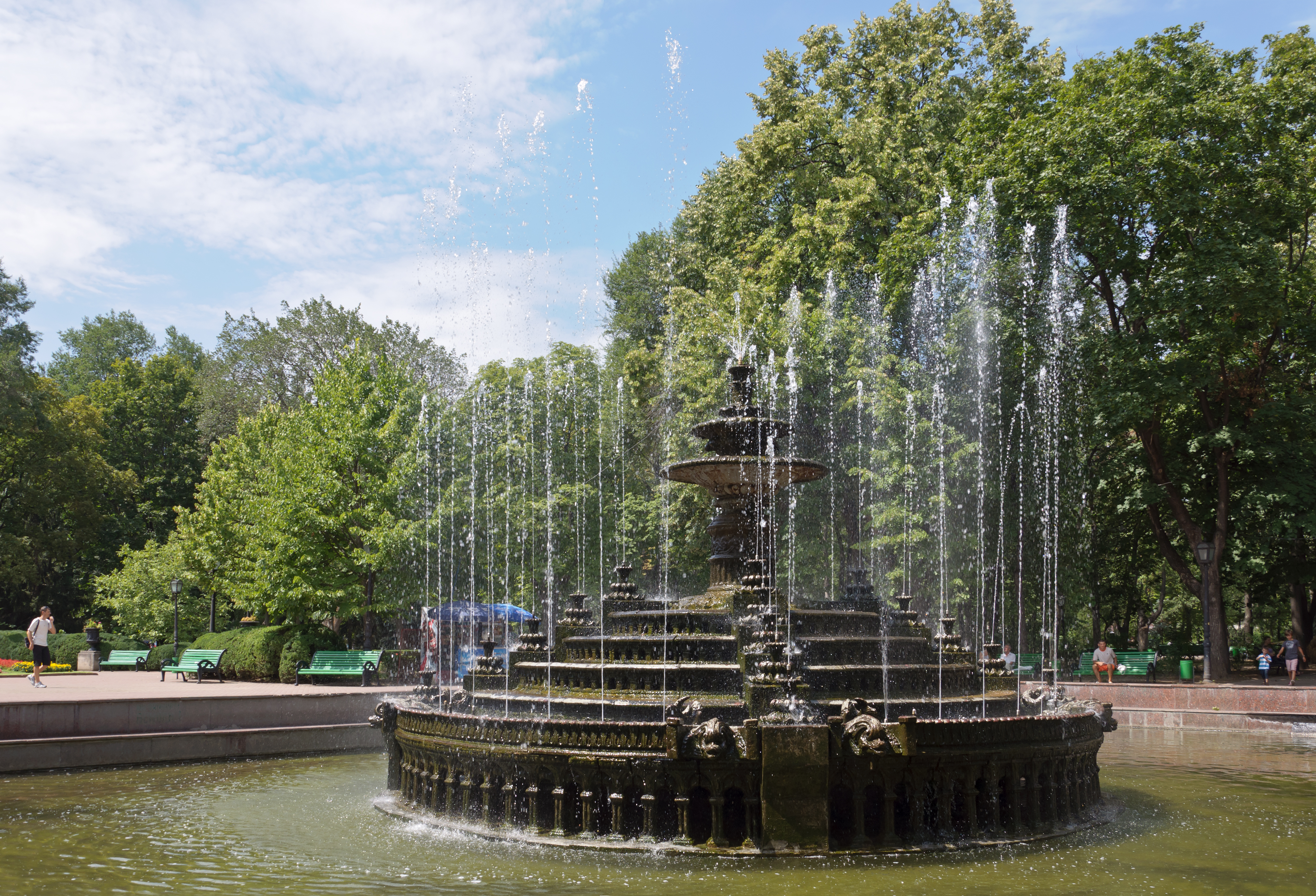
- The main fountain of the park
- Interactive map of Stephen the Great Central Park
- Type: Urban park
- Location: Central Chișinău, Moldova
- Area: 7 ha (17 acres)
- Created: 1818
- Operator: Chișinău City Hall
- Status: Open all year

The Stephen the Great Central Park (Romanian: Grădina Publică „Ștefan cel Mare”) is the main park in Central Chișinău, Moldova. It is the oldest park in Moldova and spans about 7 hectares (17 acres). It has gained the nickname "The Park of the Lovers" in Chișinău due to its popularity as a meeting spot for couples. The park contains 50 species of trees, some of which are quite old, the mulberries and acacias being between 130 and 180 years. The Alley of Classics is located in the park.

== History ==
The park was originally laid out in 1818 by Russian military engineers during the reign of Alexander I. Under the direction of architect Bogdan Eitner, the present-day alleys were created, as well as hundreds of acacias, limes, and flower beds. The park was initially enclosed by a wicker fence to prevent cows, goats, and other animals from entering.

In 1863, at the suggestion of Alexander Bernardazzi, the park was surrounded by a sturdier cast-iron fence that was manufactured in Odessa, consisting of 460 chains and weighing 5,400 kilograms (11,900 lb). A statue of Pushkin, who used to stroll the park grounds in the early 1820s, was designed by Russian sculptor Alexander Opekushin and erected in 1885, making Chișinău the second city after Moscow to have a Pushkin monument. Originally funded by the Chișinău inhabitants at the price of 1,000 golden rubles, it is the oldest surviving monument in the city. This was followed by construction of the statue of Ștefan cel Mare at the park's entrance in 1928. The latter monument was designed by the sculptor Alexandru Plămădeală, and in 1989–91 was the focal point of meetings and violent clashes between Moldova's Nationalists and pro-Soviet supporters.

Merry-go-rounds and swings were constructed in the park, as well as different stalls and pavilions for selling kvass, wine, fruit and sweets. The wooden tower of the first photo atelier was erected in the park on a small hill. In addition, the first theater was built in the place of the present Patria cinema. During World War II, a communal grave to Soviet soldiers was established in the park. After the war, the Pushkin monument was relocated to the Avenue of the Classics of Moldovan Literature, and its space was taken by the wooden, two-theater Rodina cinema. A gymnasium and hothouse were added, as well. The park currently has four fountains: the main is located in the center, where all the paths and alleys meet, and the most recent fountain was built on the 165th anniversary of the park.

In 1958, the Avenue of the Classics of Moldovan Literature was opened, lined with statues and busts of Romanian and Moldovan authors and social figures. The bronze bust are set upon bases of red polished granite, and the entrance to the avenue is guarded by marble lions by an unknown sculptor. The avenue includes such famous figures as Alexandru Hâjdeu, George Coșbuc, Mihai Eminescu, Nicolae Milescu, Tudor Arghezi, Vasile Alecsandri, Bogdan Petriceicu Hasdeu, Constantin Stamati, Alecu Russo, Lucian Blaga, Gheorghe Asachi, Constantin Stere, Alexei Mateevici, Constantin Negruzzi, Mircea Eliade, Ion Creangă, Alecu Donici and Dimitrie Cantemir.

In the later decades of Soviet power, the Alley of Friendship was created, where prominent guests of Chișinău planted trees; among were them Yuri Gagarin, Mikhail Gorbachev and Meliton Kantaria. In 2009, free park Wi-Fi access was launched.

== Gallery ==
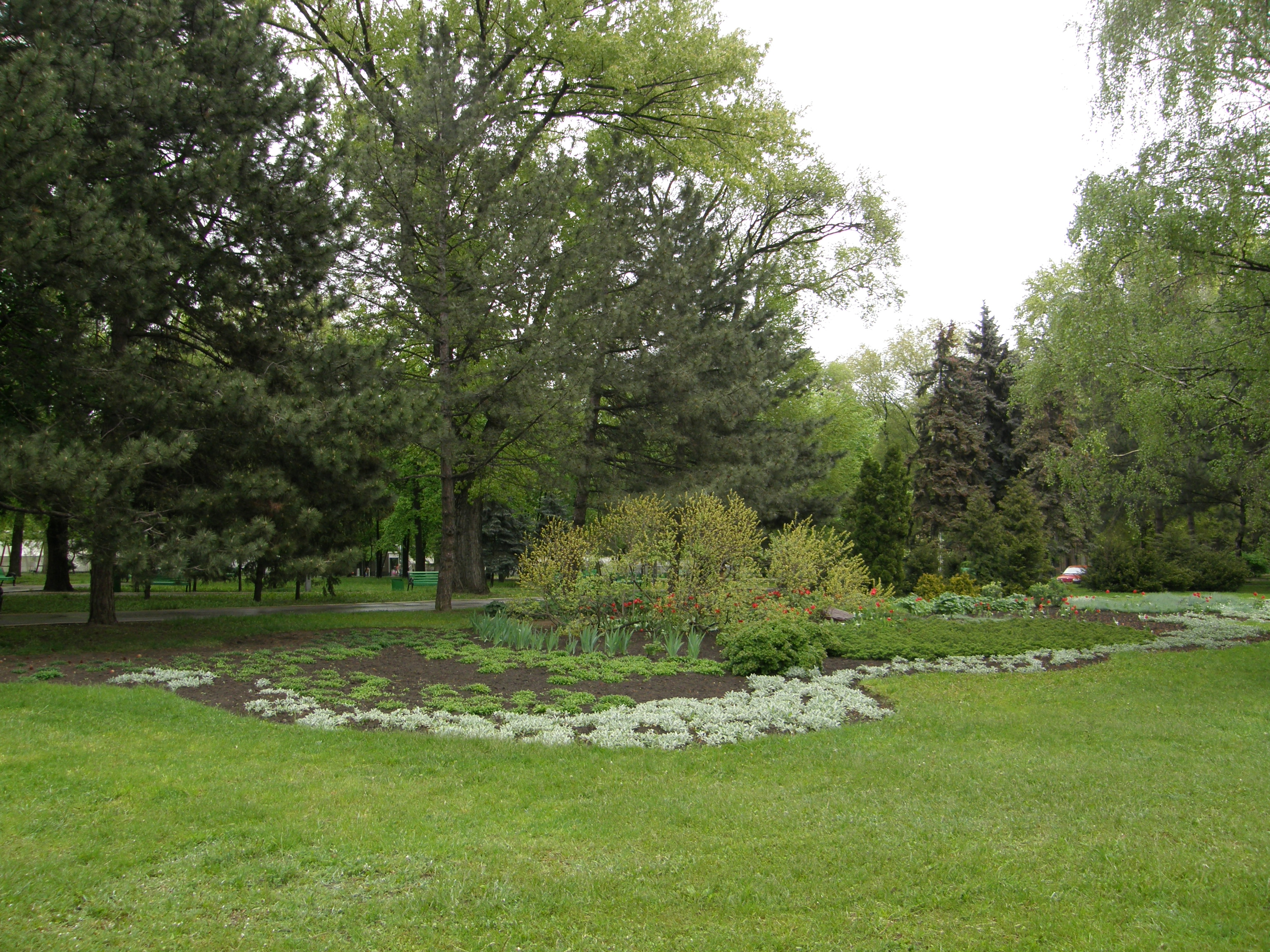
Springtime

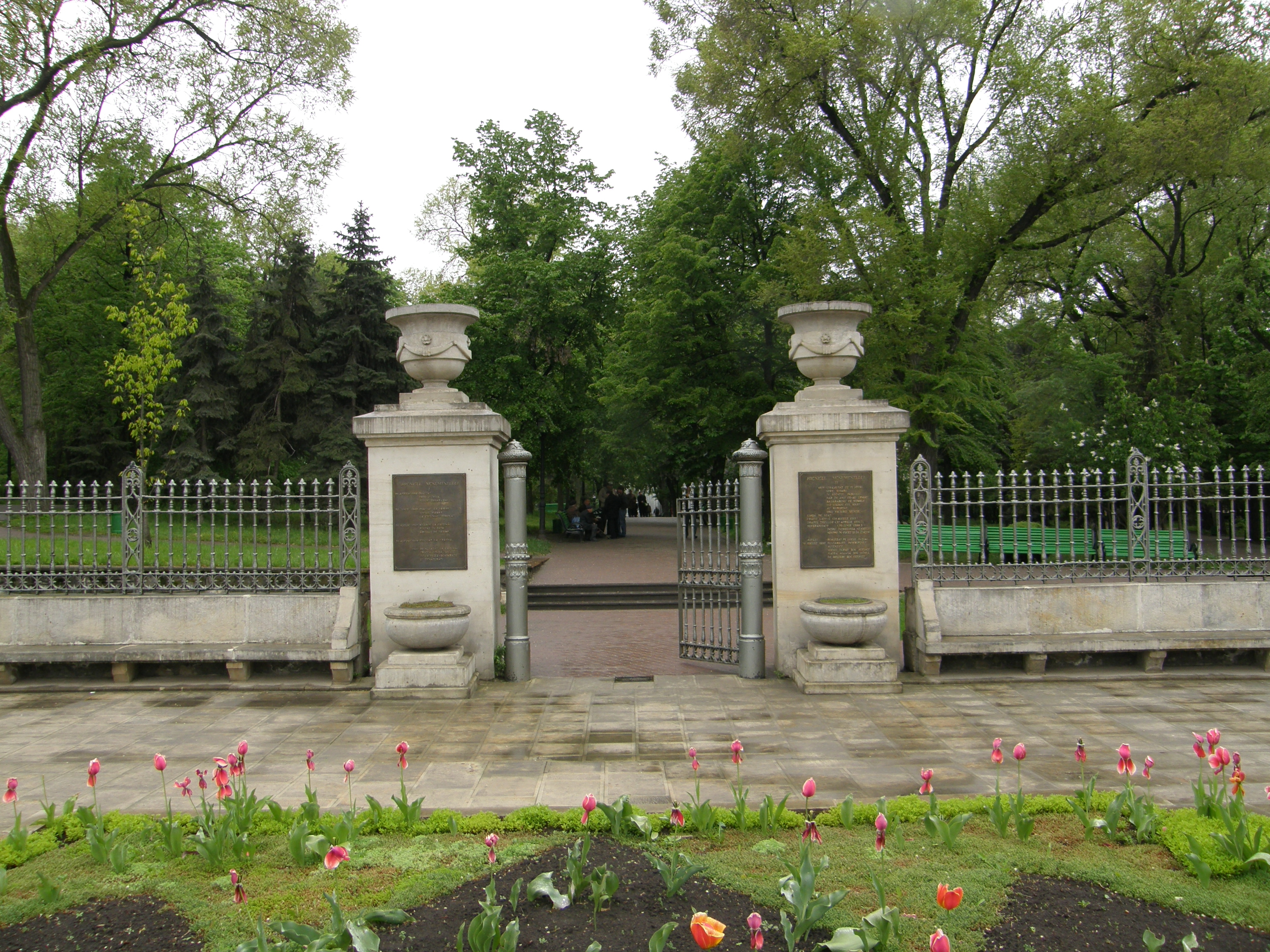
An entrance

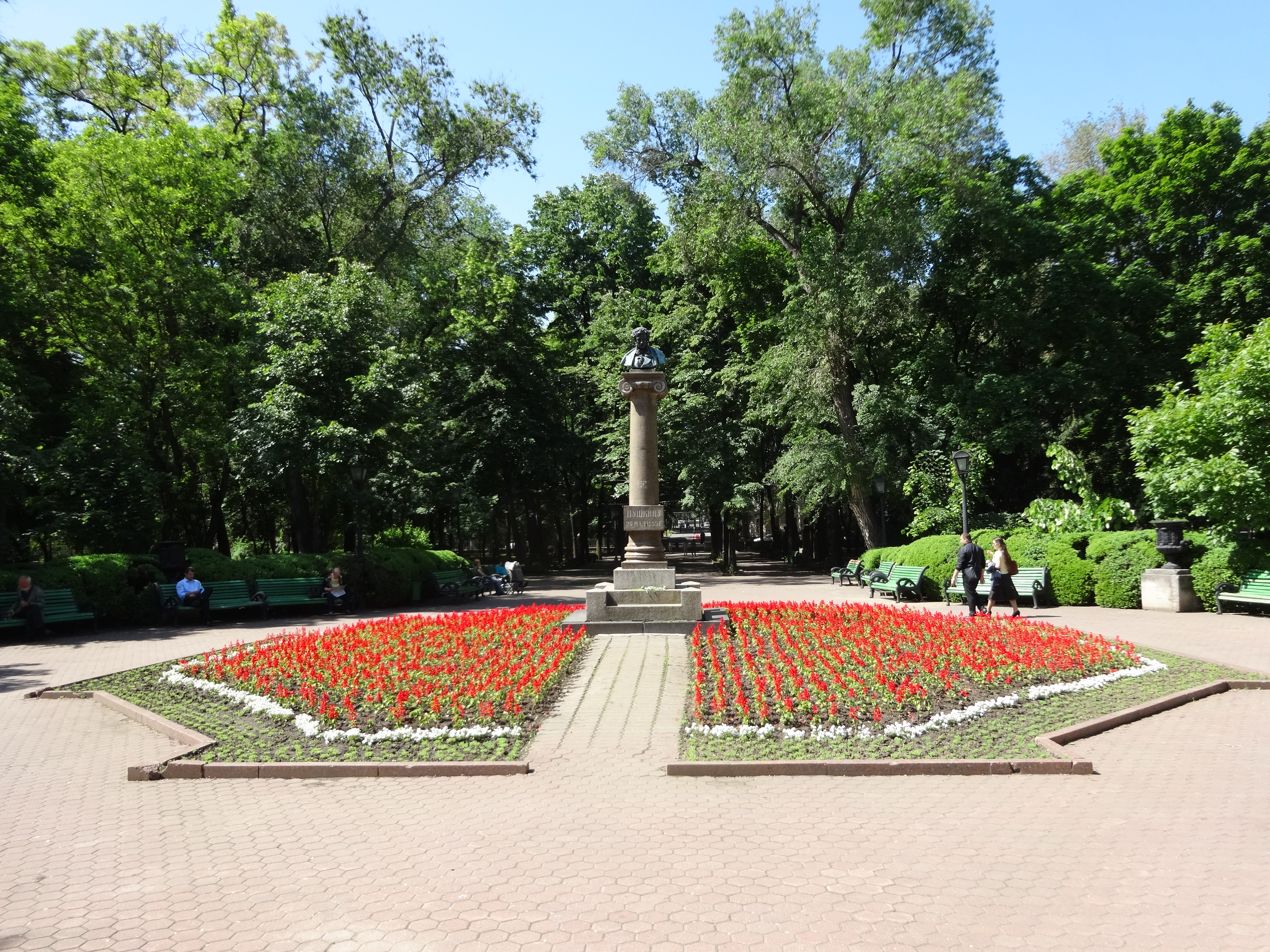
Gardens

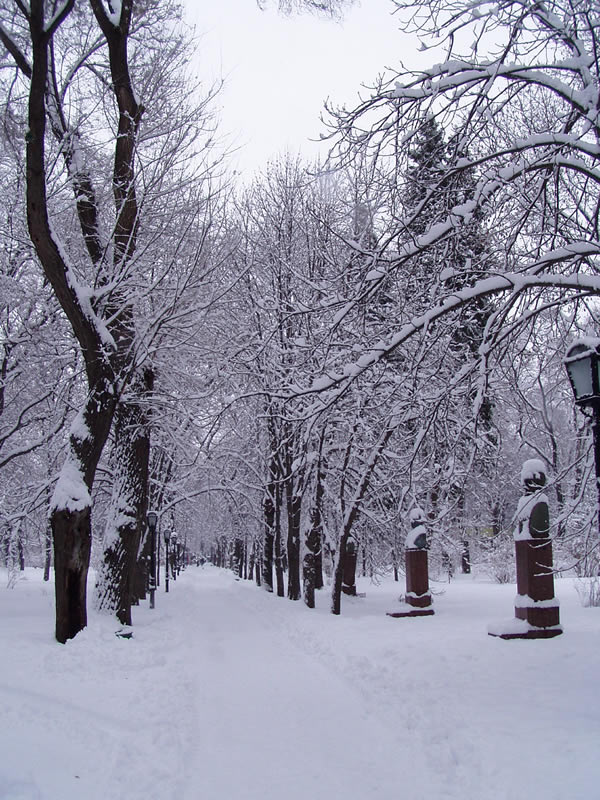
The Alley of Classics in winter

== Bibliography ==
- Colesnic, Iurie (1997). Chişinău. Enciclopedie. Chişinău: ed. „Museum”. pp. 234–235.
