= Alley of Classics, Chișinău =

Alley of Classics
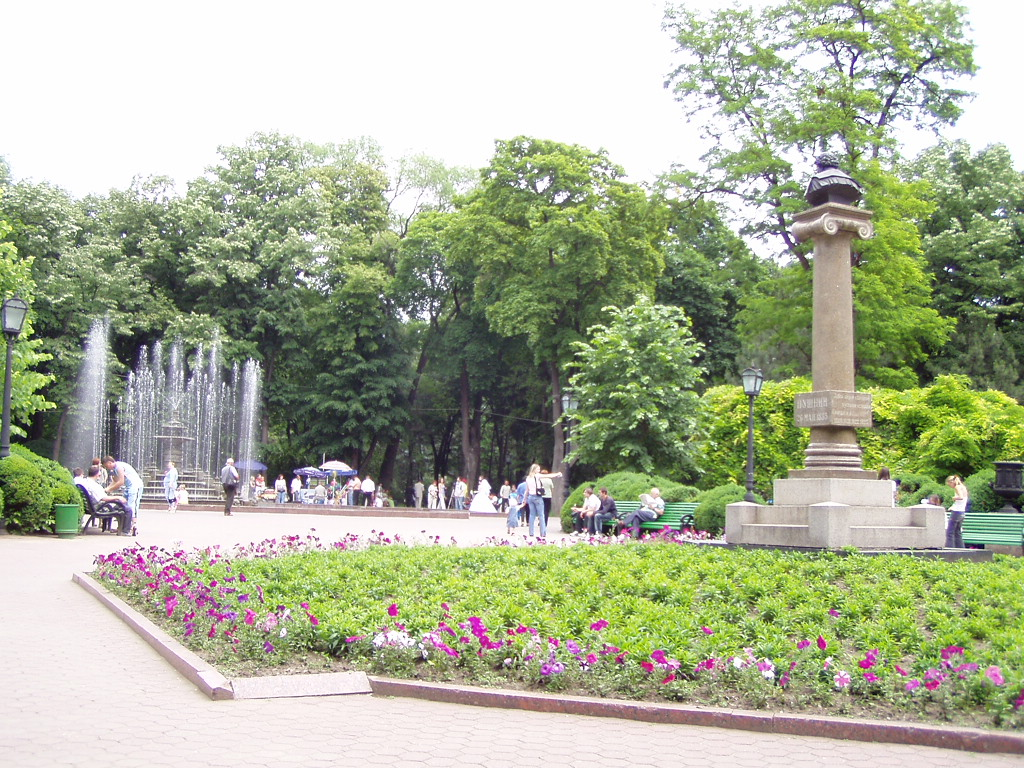
- Interactive map of Alley of Classics
- Location: Central Chișinău
- Coordinates: 47°01′32″N 28°49′39″E
- Type: Sculptural complex
- Beginning date: 1957
- Opening date: April 29, 1958
- Dedicated to: Romanian cultural elite

The Alley of Classics (Romanian: Aleea Clasicilor) is a sculptural complex located in the Stephen the Great Park in Central Chișinău, Moldova.

== Overview ==
The alley is decorated on both sides with red granite busts of classic literary figures and political leaders from Moldova. The alley is located between the Ștefan cel Mare boulevard and the bronze bust of Alexander Pushkin, set on a granite column and made by Russian sculptor Alexander Opekushin. The alley was built and received its name in 1958, and became one of the most important tourist attractions in Chișinău. At first there were only twelve sculptures, but after the fall of the Soviet Union the local authorities added busts of Romanian and Moldovan writers and poets that were banned during the Soviet regime.

The idea of a sculptural complex was launched by the interwar sculptor Alexandru Plămădeală, who dreamed to create an open-air museum. Just during the Khrushchev Thaw, the Alley of Classics was unveiled on April 29, 1958, in the Stephen the Great Park (former "A. S. Pușkin" Park). The sculptural complex from Cișmigiu Gardens in Bucharest served as a model.

== Busts ==
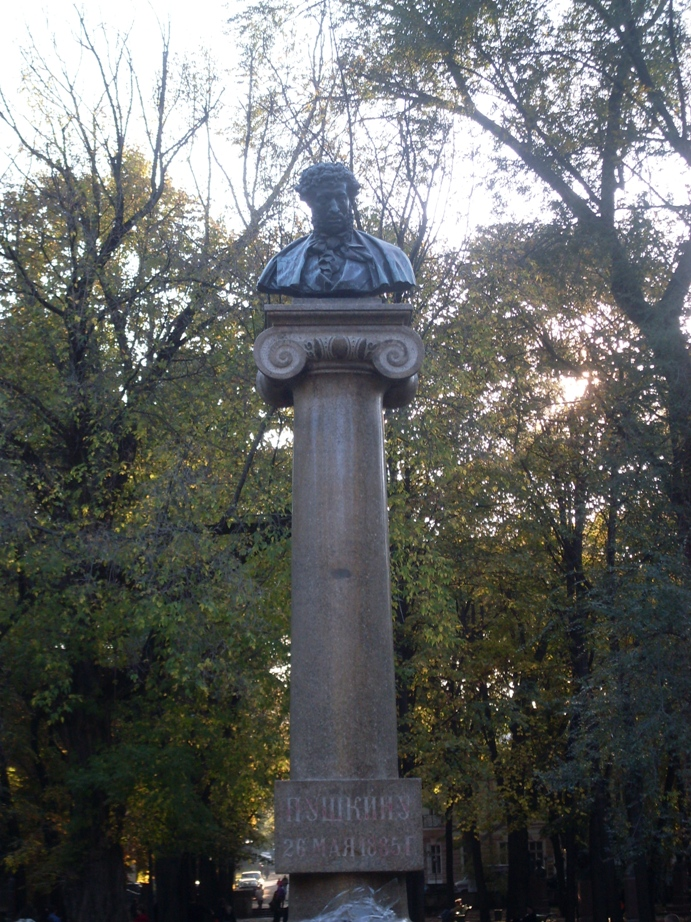
The bust of Alexander Pushkin

The Alley of Classics contains 28 busts (including that of Alexander Pushkin, lying at the head of the alley) in alphabetical order.

| Nr | Bust | Image | Unveiled | Sculptor |
|---|---|---|---|---|
| 1 | Vasile Alecsandri | | 1957 | Lazăr Dubinovschi |
| 2 | Tudor Arghezi | | 1995 | Dimitrie Verdeanu |
| 3 | Gheorghe Asachi | | 1957 | Lazăr Dubinovschi |
| 4 | George Bacovia | | 2001 | Milița Petrașcu |
| 5 | Lucian Blaga | | 1992 | Alexandra Picunov |
| 6 | Dimitrie Cantemir | | 1957 | Nikolay Gorenashev |
| 7 | George Călinescu | | 1997 | Serghei Ganenko |
| 8 | George Coșbuc | | 1996 | Constantin Popovici |
| 9 | Ion Creangă | | 1957 | Lev Averbuh |
| 10 | Alecu Donici | | 1957 | Ioan Cheptănaru |
| 11 | Mircea Eliade | | 1997 | Vasile Golea |
| 12 | Mihai Eminescu | | 1957 | Lazăr Dubinovschi |
| 13 | Octavian Goga | | 2000 | Cornel Medrea |
| 14 | Bogdan Petriceicu Hasdeu | | 1957 | Ioan Cheptănaru |
| 15 | Alexandru Hâjdeu | | 1957 | Vladislav Krakoveak |
| 16 | Nicolae Iorga | | 1990? | Mihail Ekobici |
| 17 | Mihail Kogălniceanu | | 1990? | ? |
| 18 | Alexei Mateevici | | 1990 | Dmitri Rusu-Skvortsov |
| 19 | Nicolae Milescu | | 1957 | Lev Averbuh |
| 20 | Constantin Negruzzi | | 1957 | Lazăr Dubinovschi and Aleksandr Maiko |
| 21 | Liviu Rebreanu | | 2009 | Milița Petrașcu |
| 22 | Alecu Russo | | 1957 | Vasili Larcenko |
| 23 | Mihail Sadoveanu | | 1990? | Group of artists |
| 24 | Constantin Stamati | | 1957 | Leonid Fitov |
| 25 | Nichita Stănescu | | 1990? | Group of artists |
| 26 | Constantin Stere | | 1991 | Giorgi Dubrovin |
| 27 | Grigore Vieru | | 2010 | Victor Macovei and Ruslan Tihonciuc |

== Bibliography ==
- Călina Trifan, "Aleea Clasicilor", Chișinău, Editura "Arc", 2009.
