= Guguță Café =

Coffeehouse in Chișinău, Moldova

Coordinates: 47°1′35″N 28°49′38″E

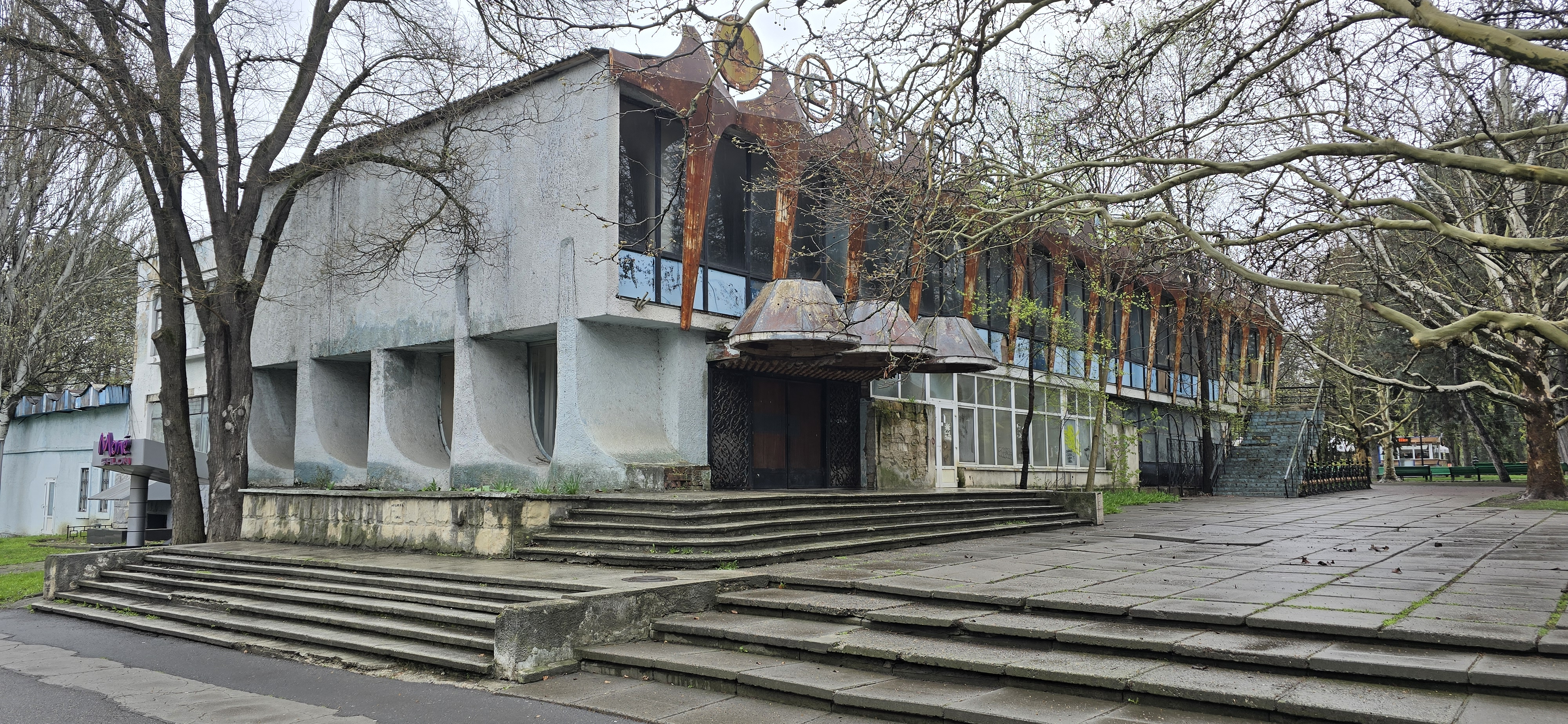
Cafeneaua Guguță (2025)

Guguță Café (Romanian: Cafeneaua „Guguță”) was a popular coffeehouse in the historical centre of Chișinău, Moldova. It was located in the Ștefan cel Mare Central Park.

== History ==
The initial construction of the building took place between 1967 and 1969. It was originally designed by architects V. Kudinov and V. Zakharov to host a restaurant called Noroc. The restaurant remained open until 1976 when it was transformed into a coffeehouse.

The coffeehouse was rebuilt in 1979 by Sergei Lebedev and Nicon Zaporojan. As part of the redesign, a metal construction was hung on the original modernist façade and reversed concrete arches were added to the side of the building. It was renamed Guguță Café in 1981 after the well-known children's book character. The entrance canopy symbolizes Guguță's hat.

In 2010, the land under the building was controversially sold by the municipality to a company affiliated to Vladimir Plahotniuc. In 2018, the Court of Appeal in Chișinău ruled that the new private owners can demolish Guguță Café and erect a multistorey building in its stead.

The impending demolition of the coffeehouse and circumstances surrounding the multistorey building permit have inspired a broader pro-democracy protest movement called Occupy Guguță.
