= Tatiana Baillayre =

Romanian artist

Tatiana "Tania" Baillayre (13 December 1916 – 1 January 1991) was a Romanian artist.

== Biography ==
Tatiana Baillayre, also known as Tania Baillayre or Balier, was born in Petrograd, Russia. She was the daughter of French painter Auguste Baillayre, a professor and director (1939–1941) of the Museum of Fine Arts in Chișinău, and Lidia Arionescu-Baillayre, also an artist. She studied painting at the school of art in Chișinău and at the Academy of Fine Arts in Bucharest. She also studied at the Sorbonne in Paris. Baillayre painted portraits, landscapes and still lifes. Her paintings were shown in group exhibitions in France and the Soviet Union. She settled in Bucharest in 1937 and had a number of solo exhibitions there. Her paintings were also included in exhibitions of Romanian art in China, the Soviet Union, Brazil, Sweden, and Italy.

She married painter Gheorghe Ceglokoff. Baillayre died in Bucharest at the age of 74.

Her work is included in the collection of the National Museum of Art of Romania as well as other public and private collections.

== Selected works ==
- Flori – Flowers (a series of seven paintings, 1934)
- Studiu – Study (series, 1934)
- Schiță – Sketch (1938)
- Nud – Nude (1938)
- Lăculeţe – Small ponds (1938)
- Cap - Head (1938)
- Peisaj –landscape (print, 1938)
- Natură moartă – Still life (1938)
- Puntea veche din Banat – The old bridge at Banat (watercolor)
- Natură moartă sau statică – Still life (oil)
- Primăvară – Spring (Two color print)
- Chișinău (print)
- Zbor vechi – Ancient flight (print)
- Trandafirii galbeni – Yellow roses (watercolor)
