= Alecu Donici =

Romanian writer (1806–1865)

Alexandru Donici
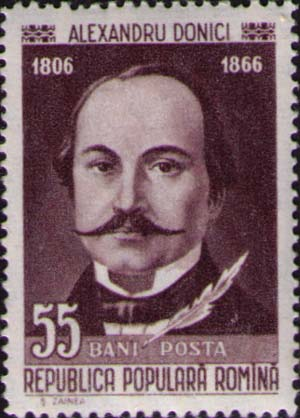
- Born: January 19, 1806; Donici, Orhei, Romania
- Died: January 21, 1865 (aged 59); Piatra Neamț
- Education: Saint Petersburg Military Academy
- Occupation: Civil servant in Chişinău
- Spouse(s): Maria Rosetti-Bălănescu (her death); Profira Krupenski
- Writing career
- Language: Romanian
- Notable work: Fabule ("Fables")

Alecu (or Alexandru) Donici (Romanian pronunciation: [aˈleku (alekˈsandru) ˈdonitʃʲ]; January 19, 1806 – January 21, 1865) was a Moldavian, later Romanian poet and translator.

== Biography ==
He was the first of four children of Dimitrie Donici and wife Ileana Lambrino. He studied at the Saint Petersburg Military Academy, and he became a junior lieutenant in the Russian army. He was of boyar origin. Aleksandr Pushkin lived in the Donici family house during his exile from 1820 to 1823. After 1828, Donici assumed the duties of a civil servant in Chişinău, but later on he chose to resign and in 1835 settled in Iași, where most of his literary career unfolded. His chief work, a two-volume book of fables titled Fabule (Fables), was published in Iaşi in 1840; it shows the strong influence of Ivan Krylov.

He translated the works of Aleksandr Pushkin and Antioch Kantemir.

== Gallery ==
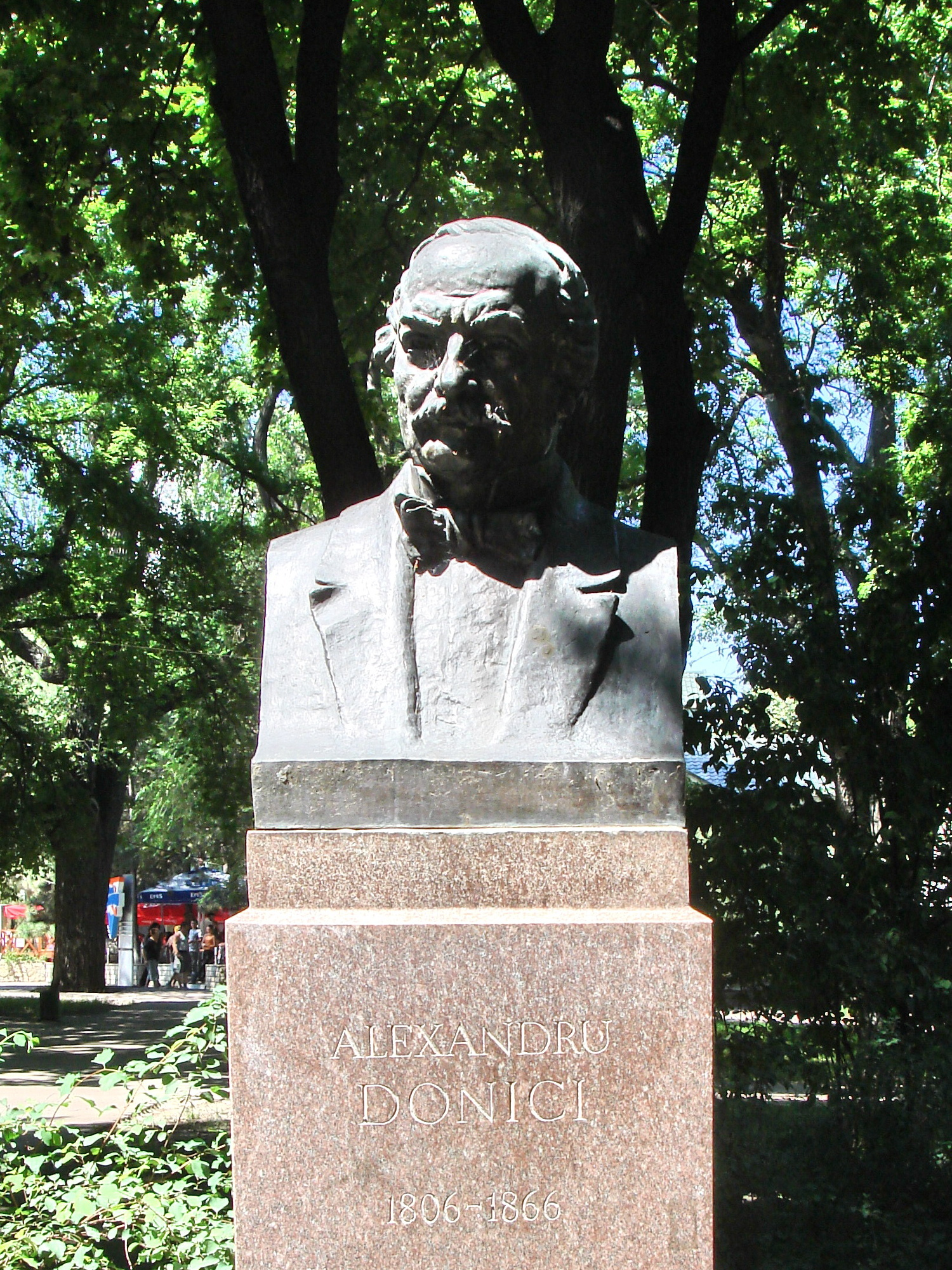
Alley of Classics, Chişinău

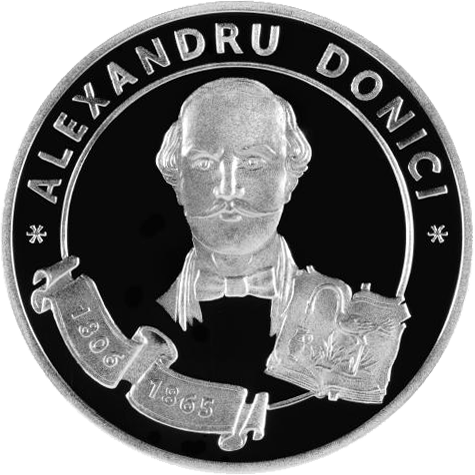
Alecu Donici on a Moldovan coin
