= National Museum of Fine Arts, Chișinău =

Coordinates: 47°1′42″N 28°49′32″E

National Museum of Fine Arts of Moldova
- Muzeul Național de Artă al Moldovei
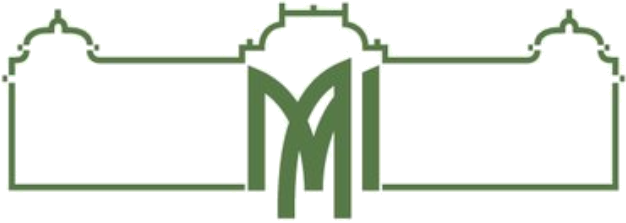

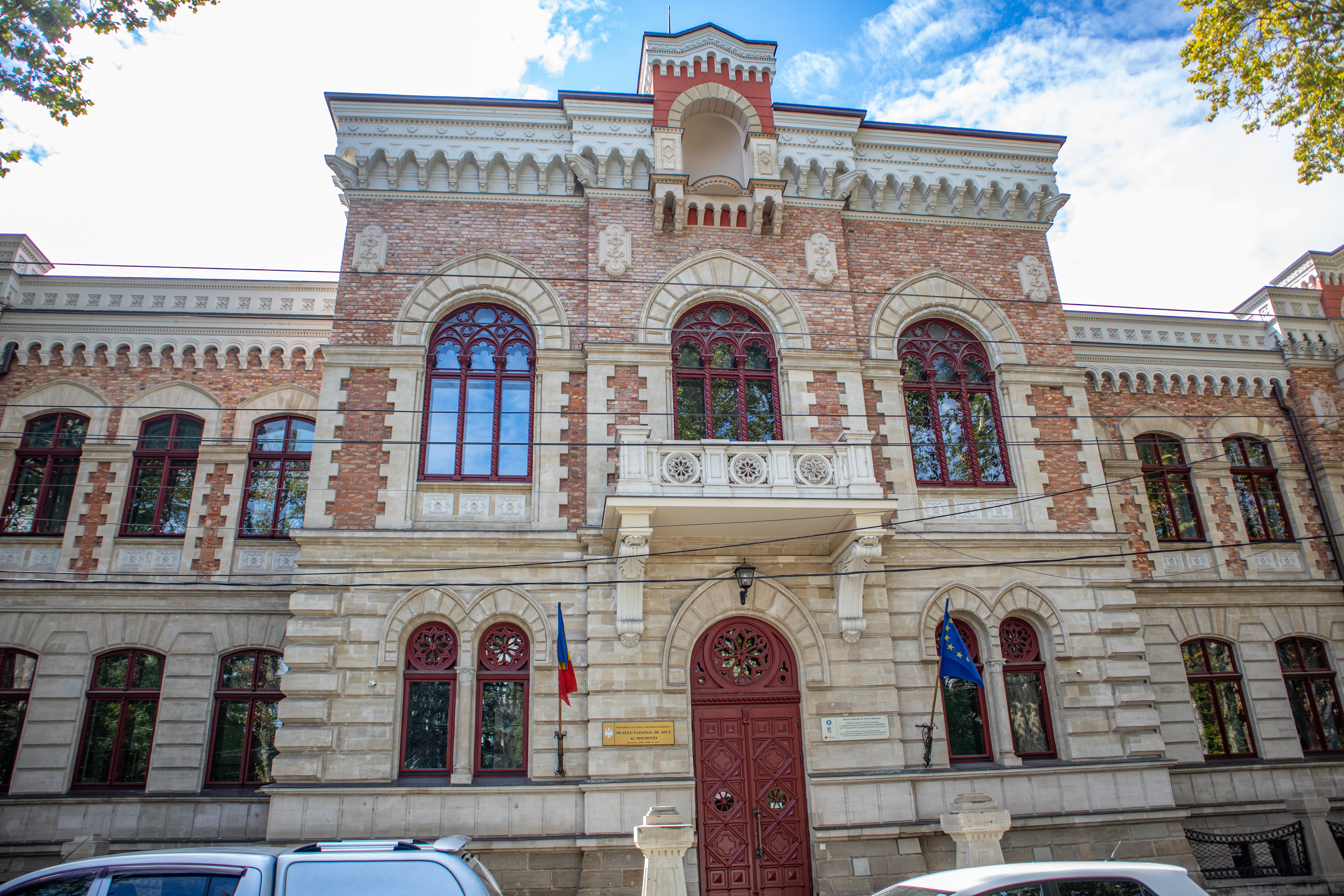
- The museum's main building
- Established: November 26, 1939
- Location: 115, 31 August 1989 Street, Chişinău
- Type: Art museum
- Director: Auguste Baillayre
- Website: mnam.md

The National Museum of Fine Arts of Moldova (Romanian: Muzeul Național de Artă al Moldovei) is a museum in Chișinău, Moldova, founded in November 1939 by Alexandru Plămădeală and Auguste Baillayre.

== Overview ==
In 1939, the sculptor Alexandru Plămădeală selected some 160 works by Bassarabian and Romanian artists in order to set up the first Picture Gallery of Chișinău whose director was Auguste Baillayre, painter and professor at Ecolle de Belle Arte of Chişinău. The first museum of Bassarabian fine art was opened on November 26, 1939; its successor became the National Art Museum of Moldova. In the first days of World War II, the art pieces displayed in the Gallery, together with others donated by the Ministry of Culture and Cults of Romania were loaded into two lorries and delivered to Kharkiv; the fate of these collections remains unknown until present.

=== Building ===
The building of the museum (architect Alexander Bernardazzi) is a monument in Moldova. It was previously known as Dadiani's female gymnasium.

Another department of the museum is located in the Herța House (urban villa), located between Ștefan cel Mare and Sfînt Avenues.

== Solo exhibitions ==
The museum has general and specific exhibitions. Ada Zevin was among those with solo exhibitions in 1960, 1970 and 1980.

Other works in the collection include those of Claudia Cobizev.

== Selected artworks ==
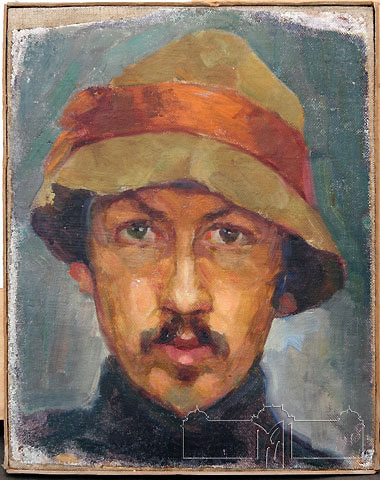
Plămădeală Alexandru, 1888-1940, Self-portrait

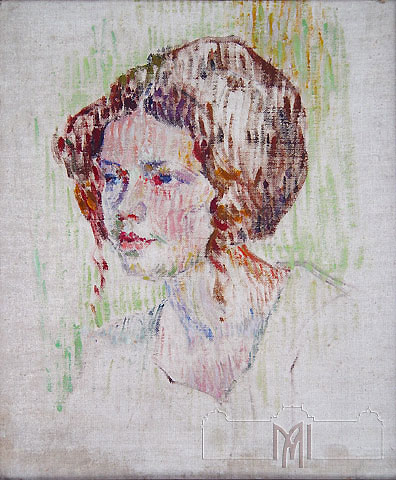
Lidia Arionescu Baillayre, 1880-1923 Portrait of a Woman, 1904

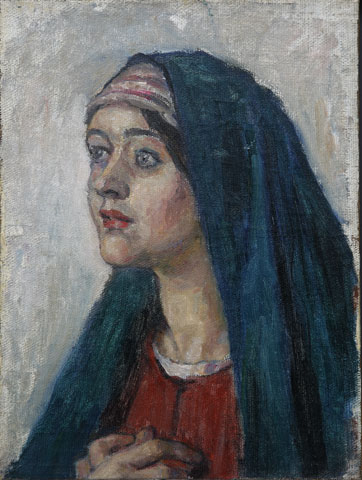
V. I. Surikov (1848-1916), Study for the painting "Annunciation"

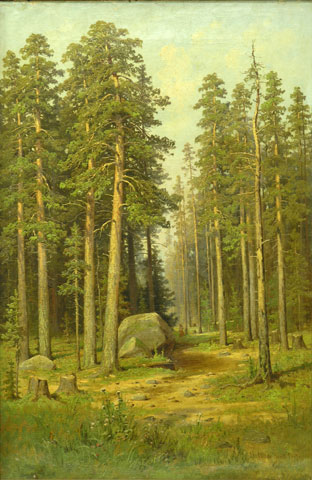
I. I. Şişkin (1832-1898). Pines

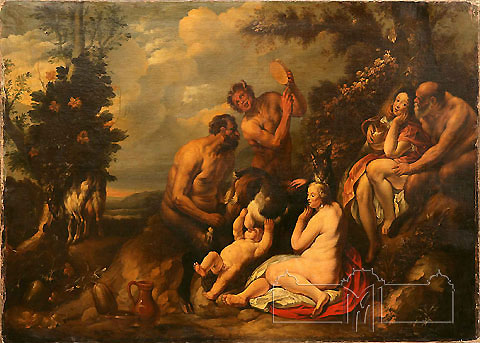
J. Jordaens (1563 – 1678), Jupiter's education

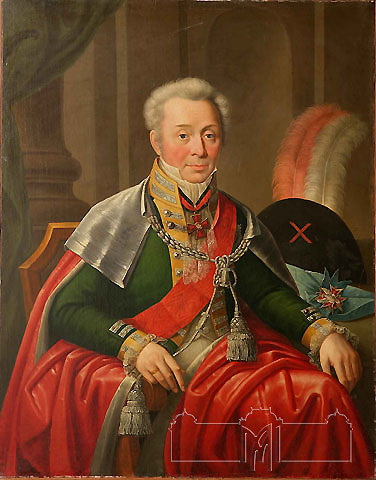
Józef Oleszkiewicz (1777-1830), Portrait of PV Meatlev, 1825

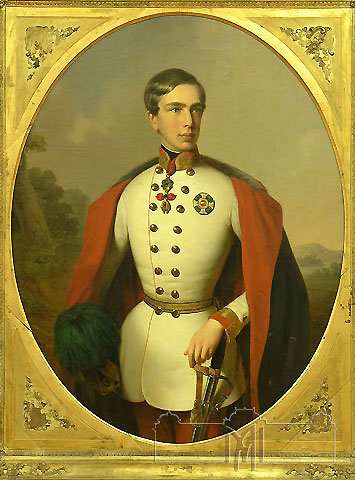
Federico Ruiz (1837-1868), Emperor Franz Joseph I

=== Selected prints ===
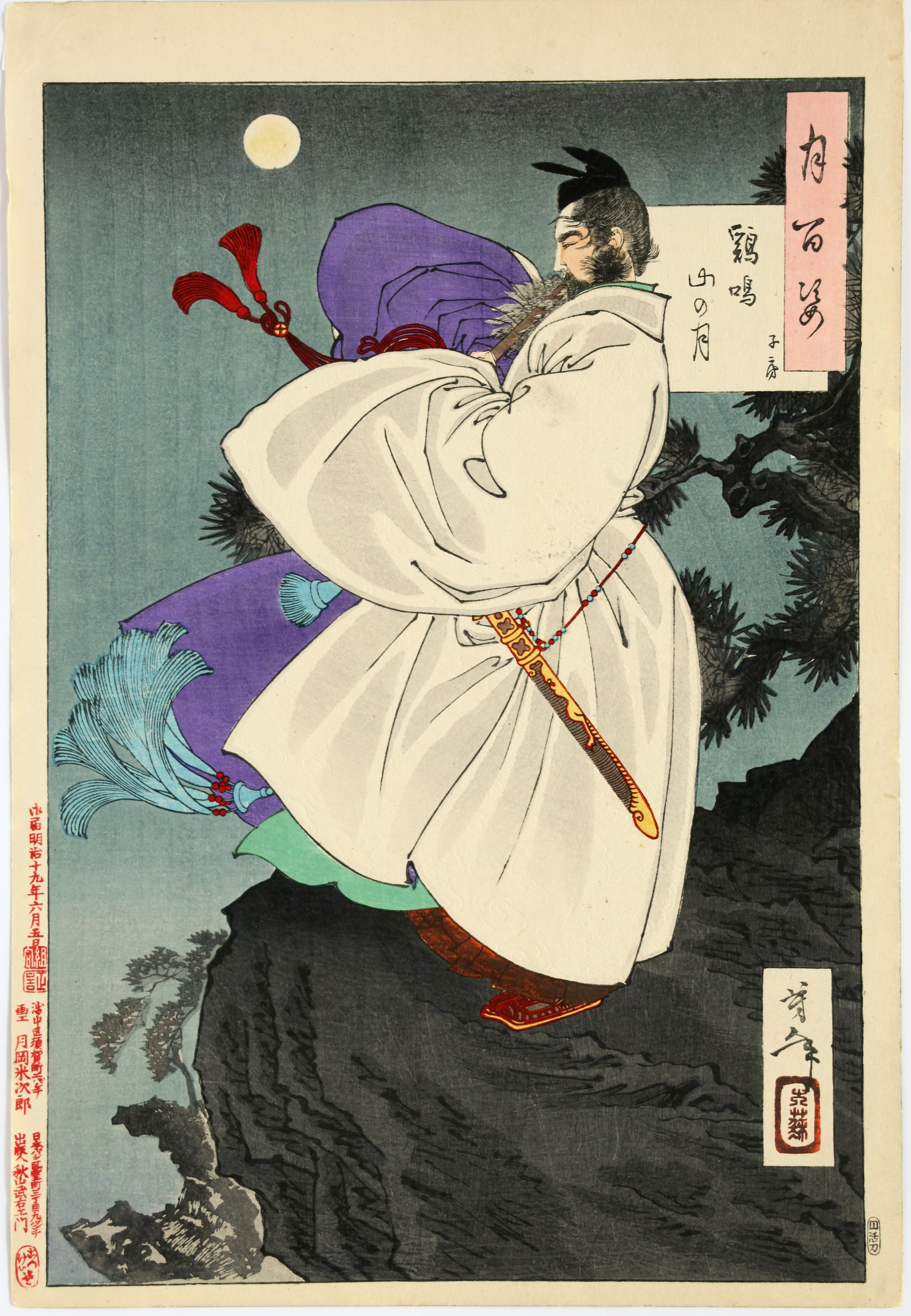
Tsukioka (Taiso) Yoshitoshi (1839-1892), The Moon on Mount Jiming, 1886

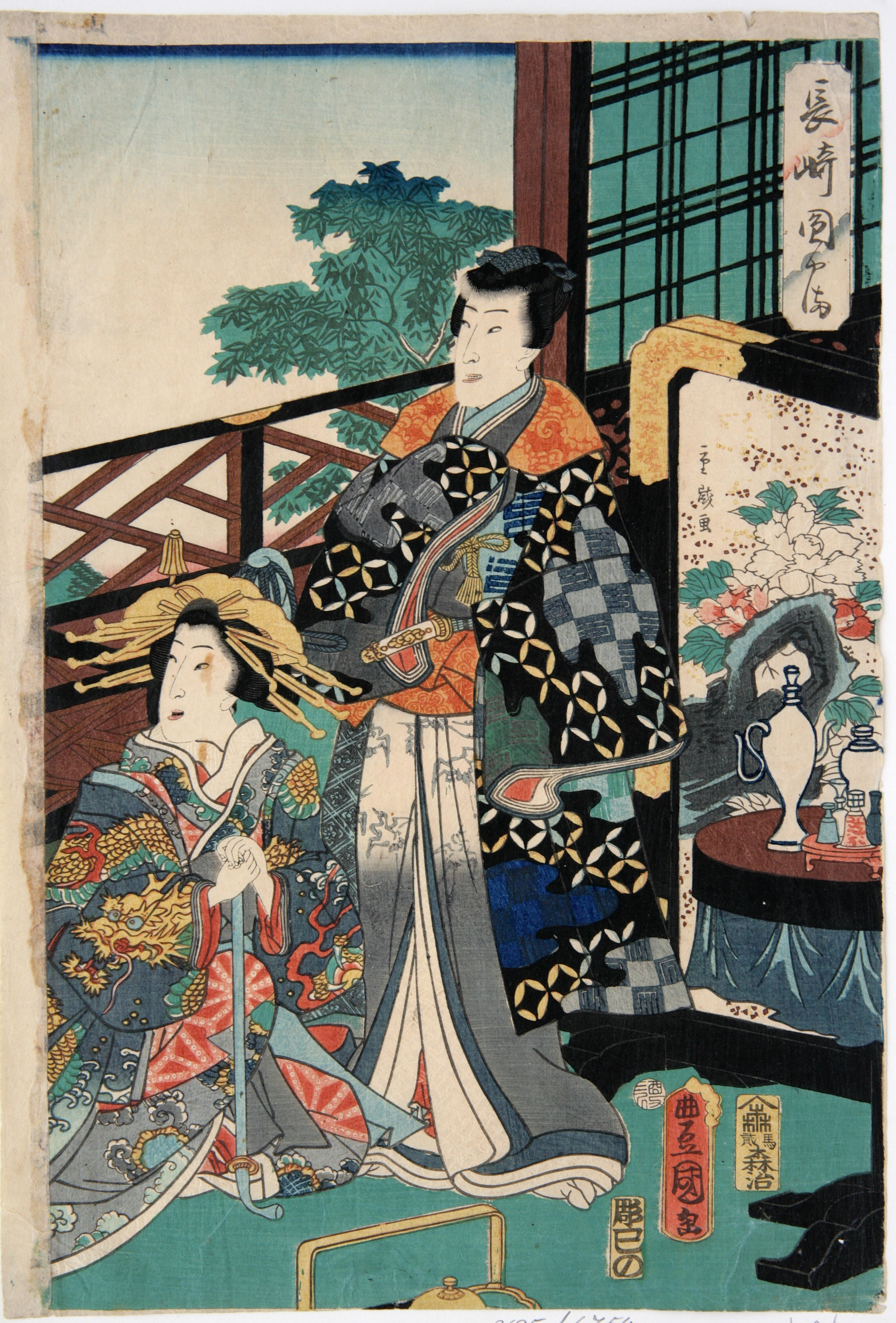
Utagawa Kunisada (1786-1864), Hiroshige II (Shigenobu) (1826-1869), Nagasaki Maruyama Pleasure District, 1861

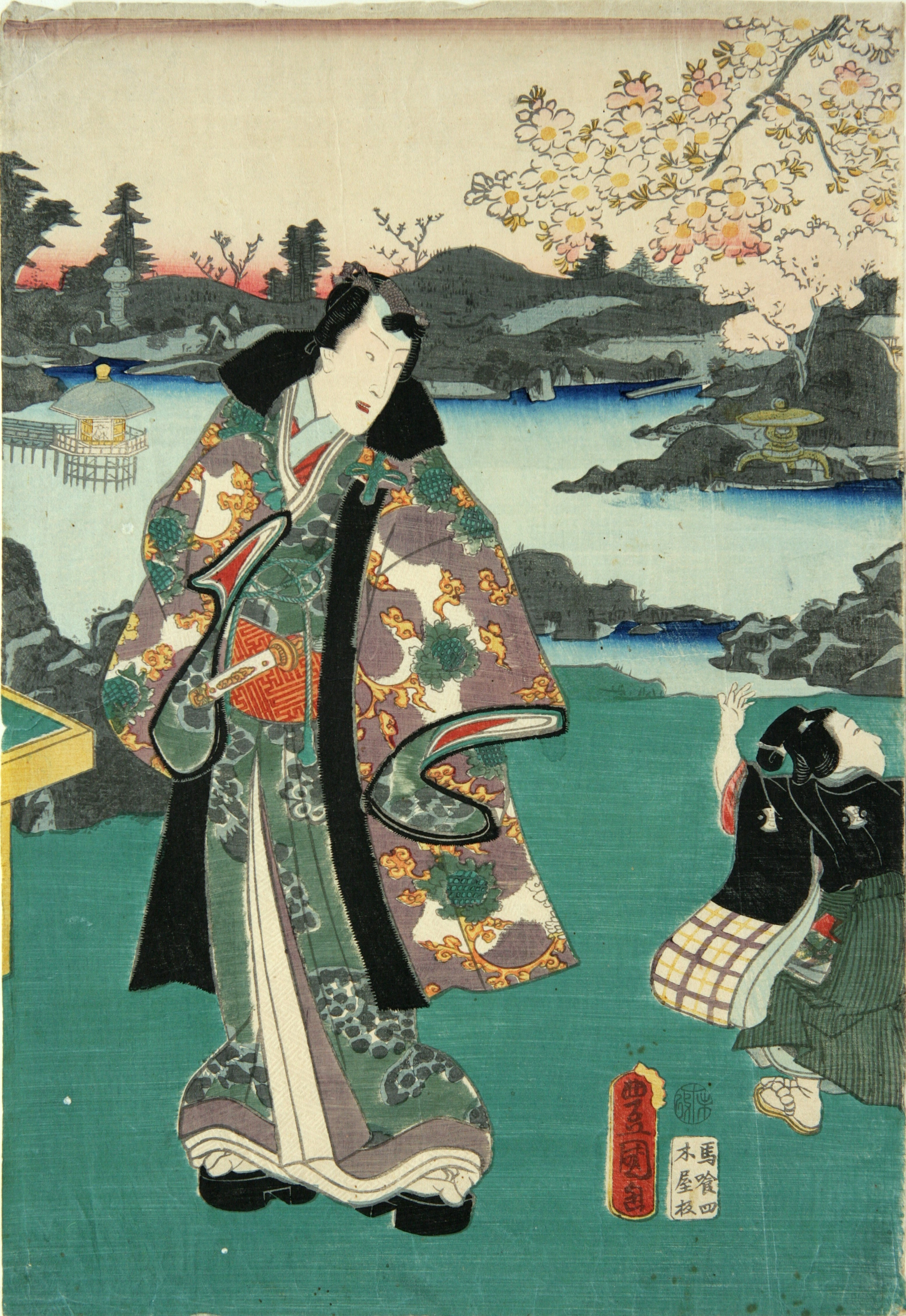
Utagawa Kunisada (1786-1864), Genji, modern, admiring cherry blossoms, 1859

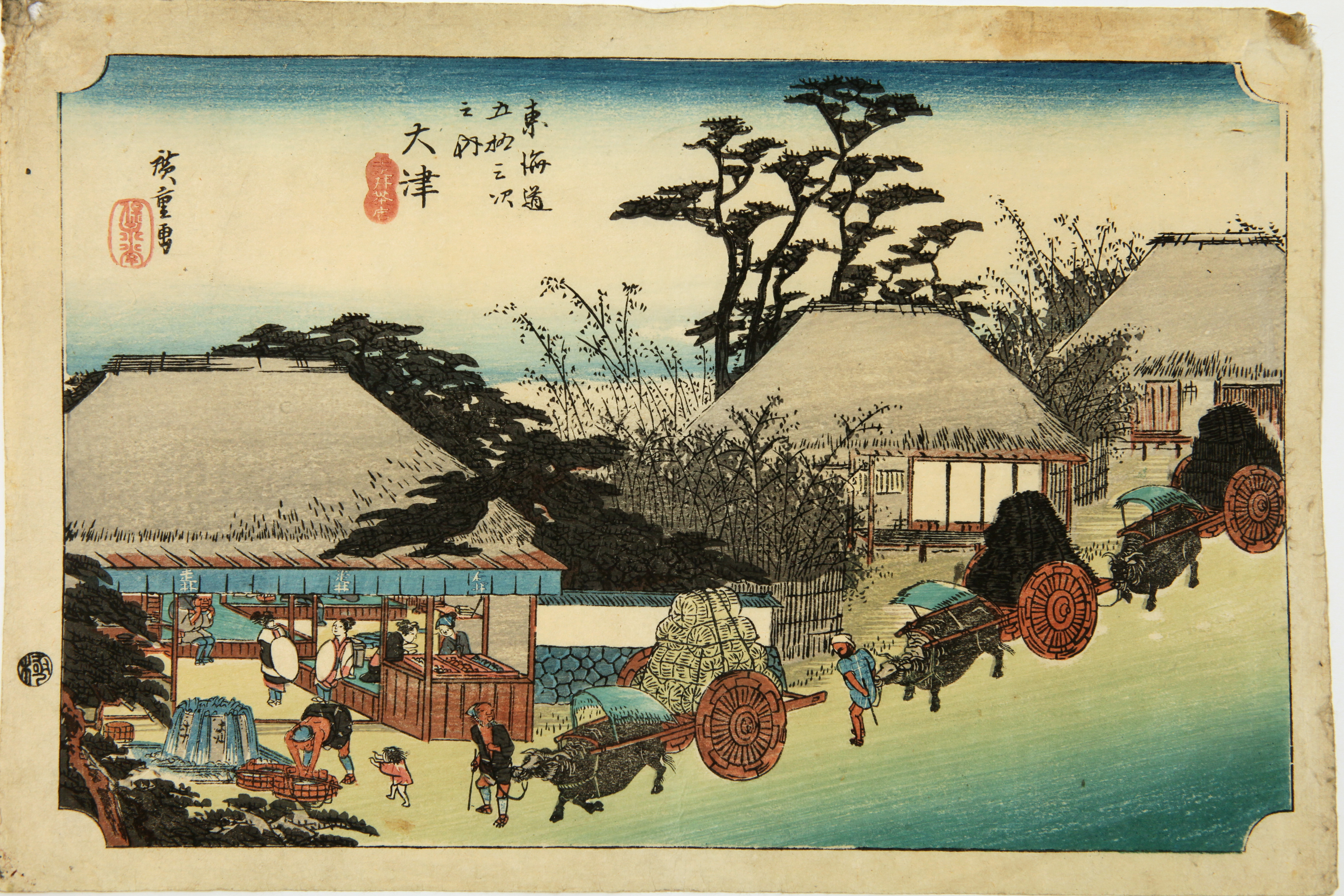
Utagawa Hiroshige (1797-1885), Hashirii Teahouse

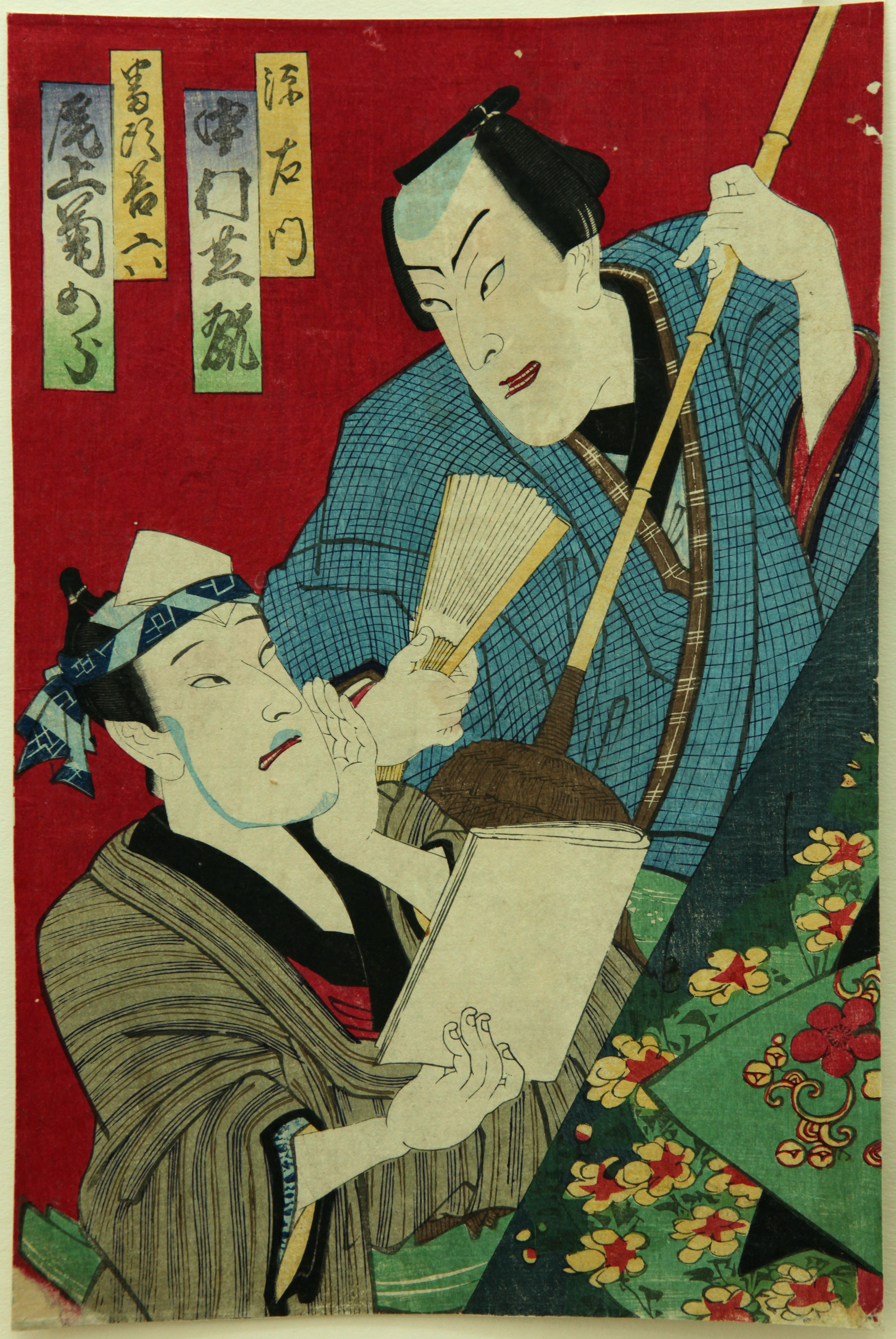
Toyohara Kunichika (1835-1900), Nakamura Shikan as Gen'emon, Onoe Kikugorō as Bantō Zenroku

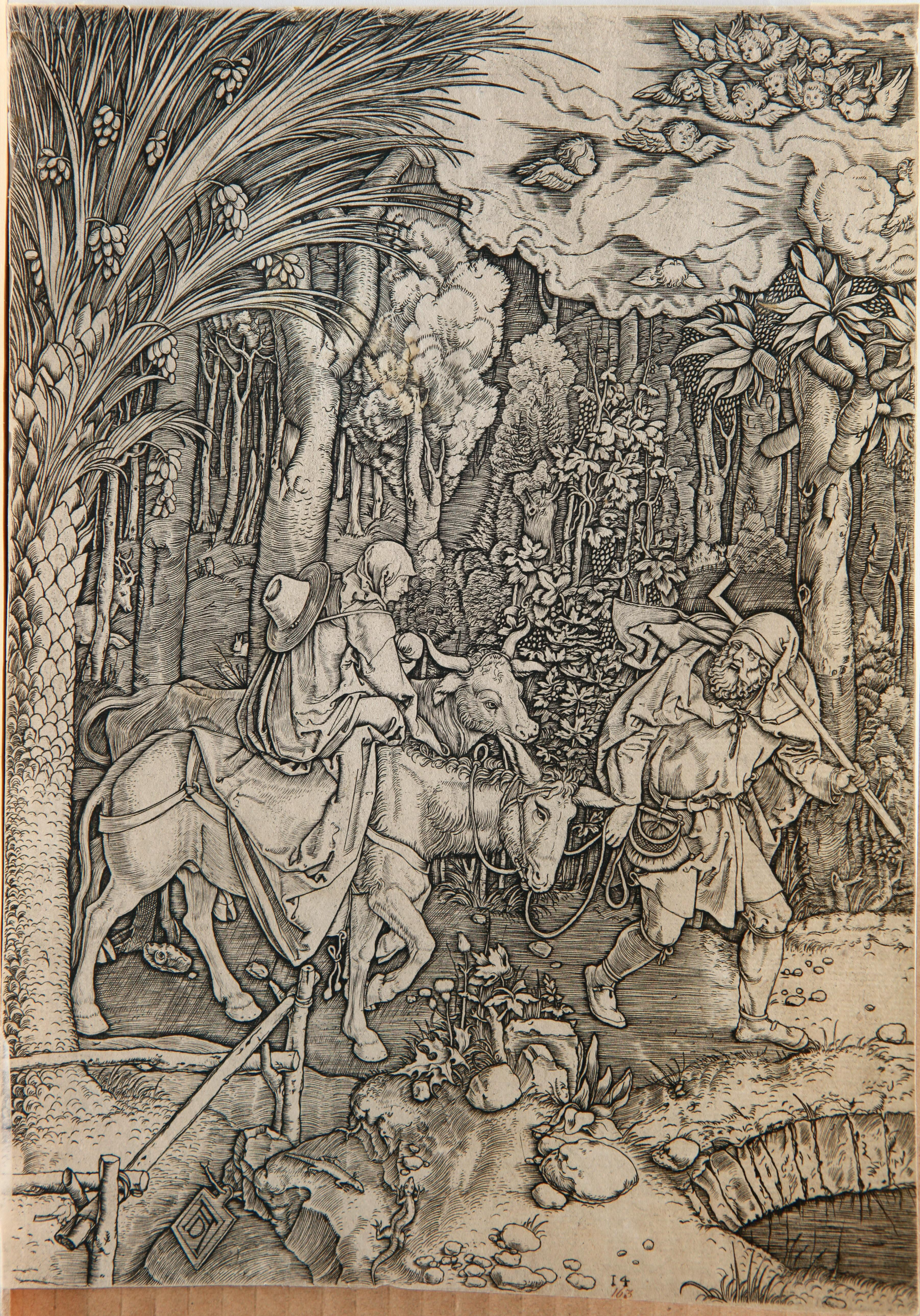
Albrecht Dürer (1471-1528), Escape to Egypt

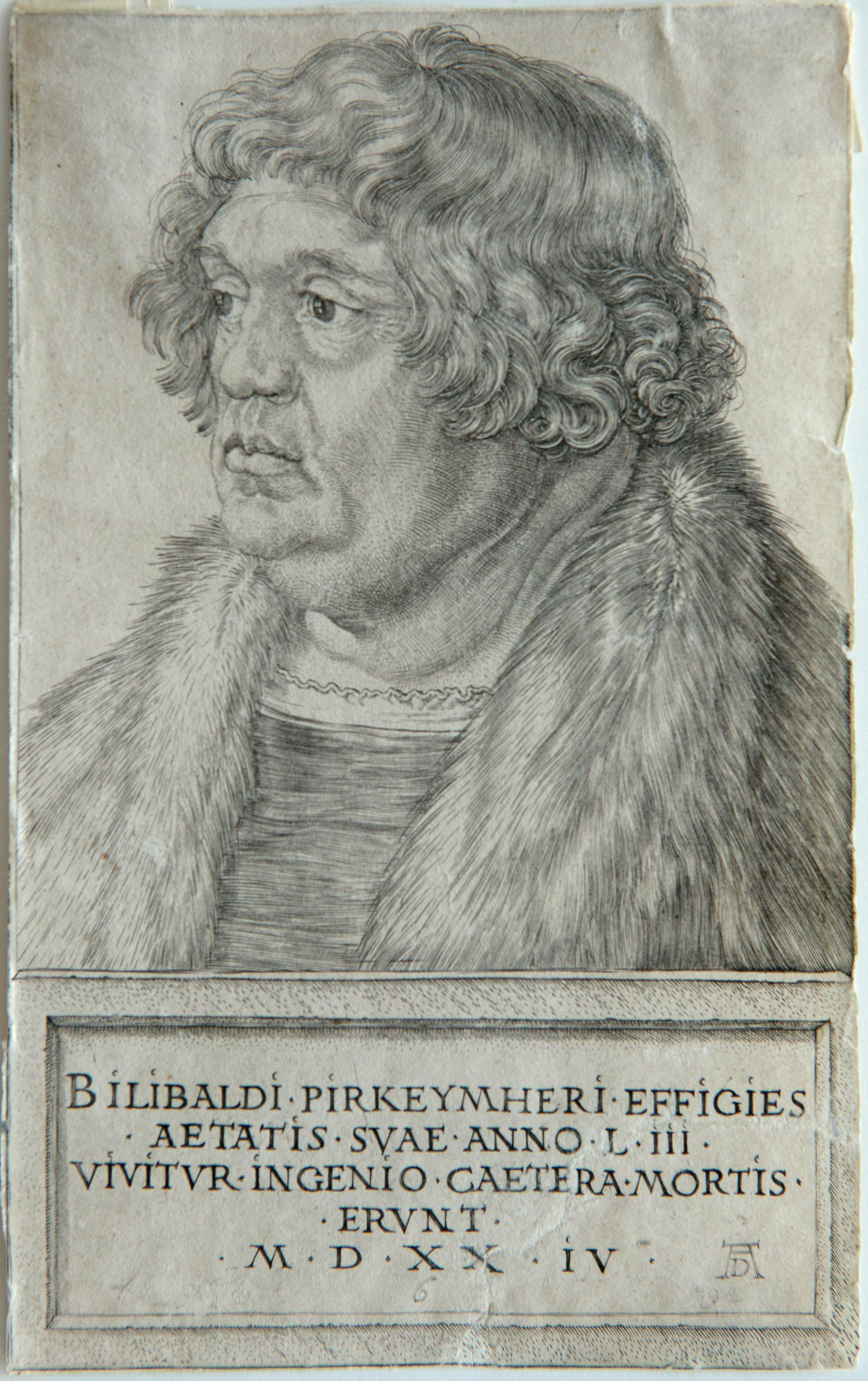
Albrecht Dürer (1471-1528), Portrait of Bilibaldi Pirkeymheri

== See also ==
- National Museum of Art of Romania
