= Claudia Cobizev =

Moldavian sculptor (1905–1995)

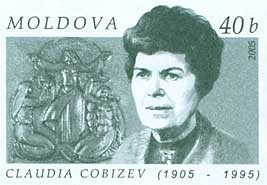
- Born: 20 March 1905; Chișinău
- Died: 28 April 1995 (aged 90); Chișinău
- Education: Chișinău Academy of Fine Arts; Académie Royale des Beaux-Arts; Academy of Arts in Bucharest
- Notable work: Cap de moldoveancă (The Moldavian Girl's Head), 1947
- Style: Soviet realism

Claudia Cobizev (Russian: Клавдия Семёновна Кобизева, romanized: Klavdiya Semyonovna Kobizeva; 20 March 1905 – 28 April 1995) was a Soviet realist sculptor from the Moldavian Soviet Socialist Republic. Known for the sensitivity she introduced to her soviet realist works, many of her sculptures and reliefs are held in the National Museum of Fine Arts, Chișinău.

== Education ==
Cobizev was born on 20 March 1905 in Chișinău. She studied at the Academy of Fine Arts under Alexandru Plămădeala, graduating in 1931. She continued her studies at Académie Royale des Beaux-Arts and at the Academy of Arts in Bucharest. She remained in Bucharest working for the sculptor Cornel Medrea and Constantin Baraschi (ro) until 1936.

== Career ==
Cobizev's work was first exhibited in 1930 by the Fine Arts Society of Bessarabia. Many of her works were inspired by the lives and experiences of rural, Moldavian women. She is also known for her sensitive portrayal of children. A pioneer in Moldovan post-war sculptural practice, she also produced works inspired by socialist realism, both in bronze and aluminium, that protested against capitalism. She was also known for her works in sculptural relief. This included the interior of a Palace of Culture in Chișinău.

In 1948 her work Cap de moldoveancă was exhibited at the Paris International Exhibition to wide acclaim. It was viewed as both a symbol of Moldova, and a symbol of the strength of women. From 1951 to 1952 she was commissioned to produce several works which were displayed as part of the Exhibition of Achievements of the National Economy (EREN) of Moldova in Moscow. She later exhibited across the states of the former USSR, including in Ulan-Bator. In the late 1950s she was commissioned to produce a sculpture of soil scientist and founder of Tashkent University, Nikolay Dimo (ru).

Cobisev died on 28 April 1995 in Chișinău.

== Awards ==
- People's Artist of the MSSR (1965)
- Laureate of the State Prize of the Republic of Moldova (1968)

== Notable works ==
- Cap de moldoveancă (The Moldavian Girl's Head), 1947, wood
- Studentă (The Students), 1954, plaster
- Țiganca din Câmpulung (Gypsy from Câmpulung), 1961
- The Mistress of the Land, 1981

== Legacy ==
Cobizev worked in soviet realist style producing works that conveyed state-driven ideology, yet, according to historian Ana Marian, she was also able to convey "psychological insight" into the people from across Moldova who she portrayed. In terms of Soviet art, her works have been compared to those of Soviet sculptor Lazar Dubinovsky.

Many of her works are held in the National Museum of Fine Arts, Chișinău. To commemorate the centenary of her birth in 2005, a commemorative stamp was designed by Simon Zamsha.
