= Alexandru Hâjdeu =

Romanian writer (1811–1872)

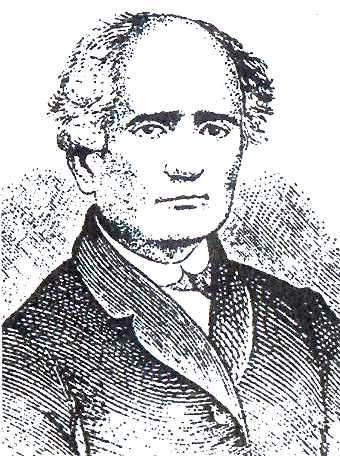
- Born: 30 November 1811; Mizyuryntsi, Volhynia Governorate, Russian Empire
- Died: 9 November 1872 (aged 60); Khotyn, Bessarabia Governorate, Russian Empire
- Known for: founding member of the Romanian Academy
- Children: Bogdan Petriceicu Hasdeu

Alexandru Hâjdeu or Alexander Faddeevich Hizhdeu (Russian: Александр Фаддеевич Хиждеу; 30 November 1811 – 9 November 1872) was a Romanian writer who lived in Bessarabia, now Moldova. He was the father of Romanian writer and philologist Bogdan Petriceicu Hasdeu. Alexandru Hâjdeu was one of the founding members of the Romanian Academy.

== Education ==
Alexandru Hâjdeu's father, Thaddeus, was a nobleman of Moldavian and Polish ancestry, while his mother, Valeria, was Jewish.

He studied at the Theological Seminary in Chișinău, then at the Law School of the University of Kharkov. In 1830, the first philosophical writings of Alexandru Hajduu - About the Divine Poetry Quality and About the Purpose of Philosophy - are published in the Moscow magazine "Vestnik Evropa". In 1836, he married Elisaveta Dauksz. In the same year he became an ephor of the schools in Hotin County. In 1838 his son Bogdan Petriceicu Hasdeu was born. On June 24, 1840, he held a famous speech in front of the graduates and pedagogical staff of the county school in Hotin - The souvenirs from the past, which is the present and shows the future of Moldova, translated immediately in Romanian by Constantin Stamati.

In 1842, he was "forced” to resign from the ephor position of the schools in the Hotin County. Then, he was employed as a teacher of French language and mathematics at the boys' school in Vinnytsia. In this period he wrote the study "The Problem of Our Time" which will be translated and published in Bucharest only in 1938. In 1860, in "History and Literature Note" appears his work Notiţă ("Note") on the work of Kantemir Voievod. In 1866, he was elected as founder member of the Romanian Philological Society.

== The Bessarabian School ==
Hâjdeu made an important contribution to the unification of the Romanian Principalities, especially, through his speeches held in 1837 and 1840. His speech held in 1837 and then, published in 1838 in Brașov and in 1839 in Bucharest, was the cornerstone of the unification of the Romanian Principalities on January 24, 1859. By the letter Epistle to the Romanians (Published on January 2, 1859), Hâjdeu defines the key element of "Romanian Messianism", also called the "Bessarabian School", by which he proves the intelligent implication (and often decisive, as in 1918) of the Basarabians in unification process of the Romanian nation.

== Gallery ==
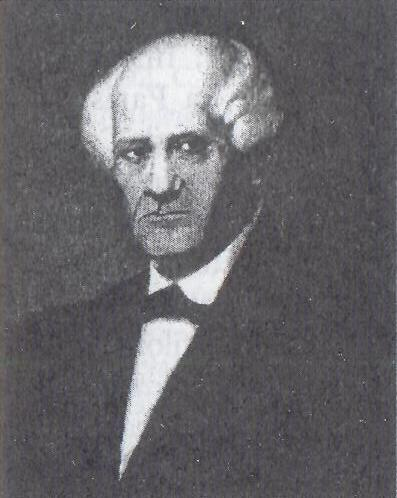

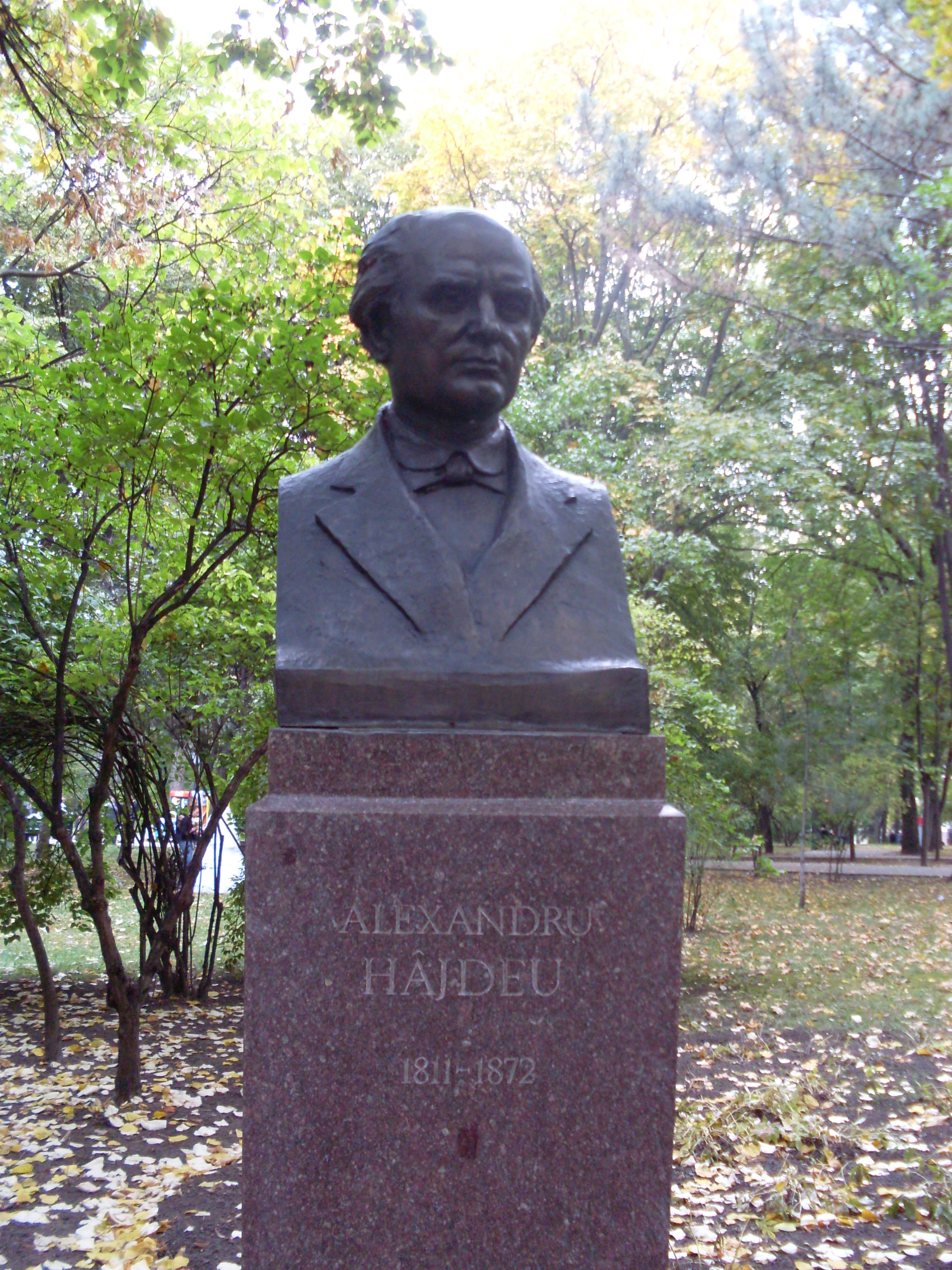
Alley of Classics, Chişinău
