= Auguste Baillayre =

French painter

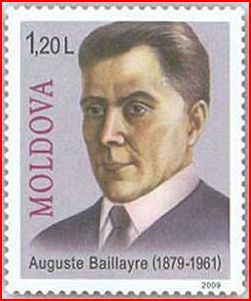
- Born: May 1, 1879; Vernet-les-Bains, Pyrénées-Orientales, France
- Died: December 16, 1961 (aged 82); Bucharest, Romanian People's Republic
- Resting place: Bellu Cemetery, Bucharest
- Education: University of Grenoble
- Known for: Painting
- Title: Director of the National Museum of Fine Arts, Chișinău
- Spouse: Lidia Arionescu (m. 1907; died 1923)
- Children: 3, including Tatiana Baillayre

Auguste Baillayre (May 1, 1879 – December 16, 1961) was a Romanian painter of French birth, active in Saint Petersburg during the Silver Age and then in Bessarabia during the Interwar era. He was a professor at École des Beaux-Arts and the first director of the National Museum of Fine Arts in Chișinău.

== Biography ==
Baillayre was born on May 1, 1879, in Vernet-les-Bains, Pyrénées-Orientales, where he spent his childhood. After spending his adolescence in Georgia (1885–1898), he studied at the Academy of Fine Arts in Amsterdam (1899–1902) and in Saint Petersburg (1903–1907), completing his studies at the University of Grenoble in 1913. He lived in Holland and Russia from 1899 to 1918, and from 1918 to 1943 he became the most important artistic personality in Bessarabia, where he was a professor at the Art School in Chișinău. Several of his works are kept at the National Museum of Fine Arts, Chișinău, of which he was the first director in 1939.

In 1907 he married Lidia Arionescu-Baillayre, a painter from Chișinău. They had two daughters, Tatiana, who also became an artist, and Marina. In 1943 he settled in Bucharest, where he died on December 16, 1961, at age 82; he is interred in the Bellu Cemetery, Bucharest. His grandson, the photographer Andrei Iliescu, recalls him saying: "Far away from the beloved ones, a stranger among strangers. In Russia I was French, in Holland and France I was Russian, in Romania, French again. Ultimately, alienated from everything and everybody."

== Legacy ==
The Post of Moldova issued, on May 1, 2009, its 9th postal stationery cover with a preprinted stamp commemorating the 130th anniversary of Baillayre. A portrait of the painter appears on the stamp and two of his works, "Still Life with Fish" (1927) and "Self Portrait with Masks" (1945), are also reproduced on the left on the envelope.

== Gallery ==
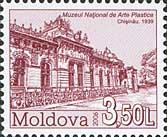
National Museum of Fine Arts, Chișinău

== Sources ==
- Stavilǎ, Tudor (2004). Auguste Baillayre. Maeştri basarabeni din secolul XX (in Romanian). Chişinǎu: ARC. ISBN 9975-61-361-6. LCCN 2006-396454. OCLC 137244522.
