= Stephen the Great Monument =

Monument in Chișinău, Moldova

Coordinates: 47°01′31″N 28°49′51″E

- Monumentul lui Ștefan cel Mare
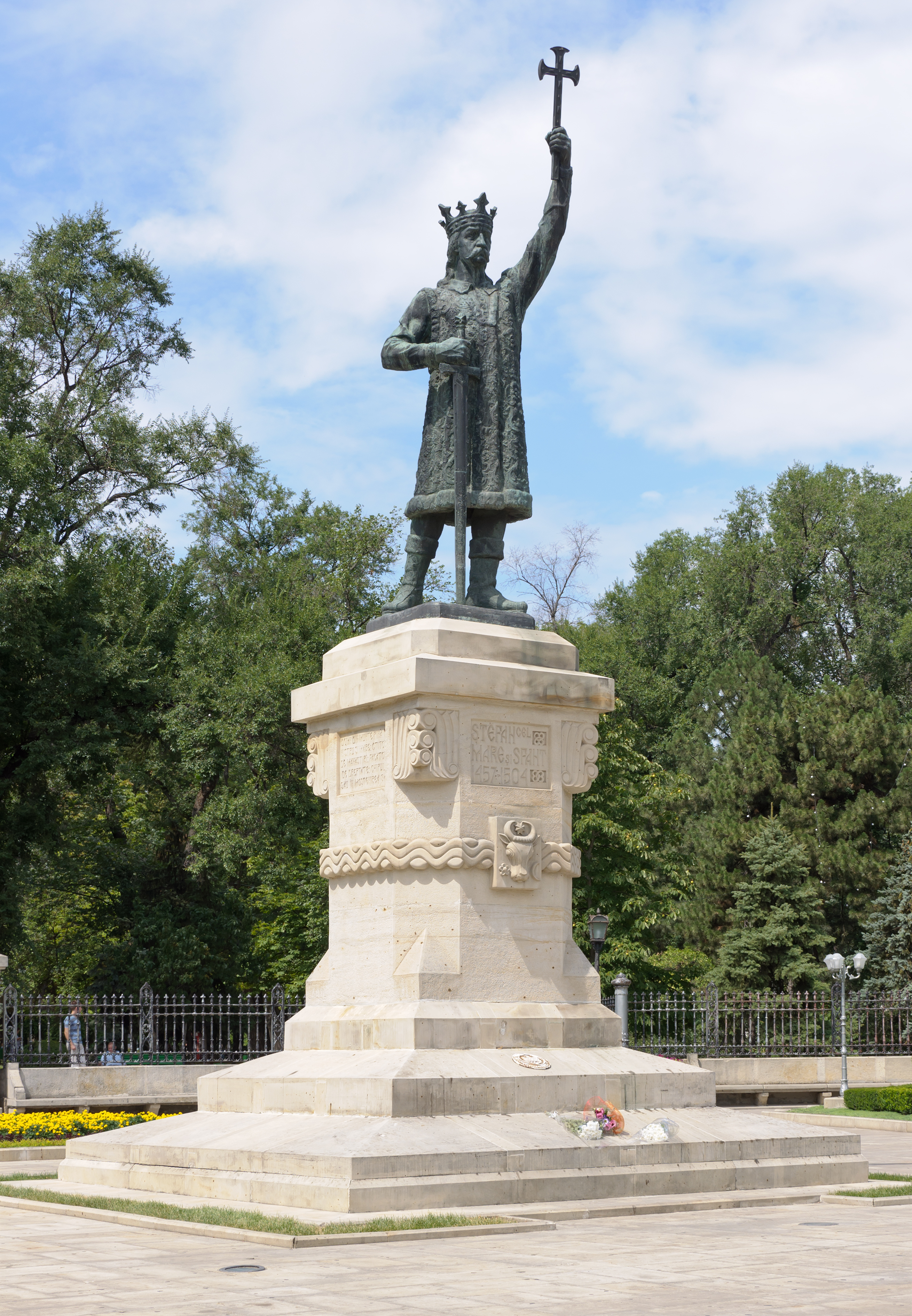
- The monument in 2012
- Interactive map of Stephen the Great Monument
- Location: Central Chișinău
- Designer: Alexandru Plămădeală
- Material: bronze, stone
- Beginning date: 1924
- Completion date: 1927
- Opening date: 29 April 1928
- Dedicated to: Stephen III of Moldavia

The Stephen the Great Monument (Romanian: Monumentul lui Ștefan cel Mare) is a prominent monument in Chișinău, Moldova.

== Description ==
The monument to Stephen the Great was designed by architect Alexandru Plămădeală in 1923. It was erected near the main entrance of the Stephen the Great Park in Central Chișinău. The monument was completed in 1927 and opened on 29 April 1928 (to replace the monument to Alexander II of Russia, destroyed by the Romanian authorities in 1918). The total cost of the monument was 4.000.000 lei.

A few days before the 1940 Soviet occupation of Bessarabia and northern Bukovina, the monument was relocated to Vaslui, and its pedestal was blown up. On August 25, 1942, the monument was returned to Chișinău and taken back to Romania in 1944. In 1945, the Soviet authorities ordered the restoration of the monument to Chișinău.

On 31 August 1989 the monument to Stephen the Great was returned to its original location, chosen by Alexandru Plămădeală in the 1920s. The initial inscriptions were restored. Flower-laying ceremonies are regularly performed at the pedestal of this monument on each national holiday and on days of official top- and high-level visits.
