= Donici =

- Commune and village
- Interactive map of Donici
- Country: Moldova
- District: Orhei District

Population (2014)
  - Total: 1,765
- Time zone: UTC+2 (EET)
  - Summer (DST): UTC+3 (EEST)

Donici is a commune in Orhei District, Moldova. It is composed of three villages: Donici, Camencea and Pocșești.
