= Constantin Stamati =

Moldavian writer and translator

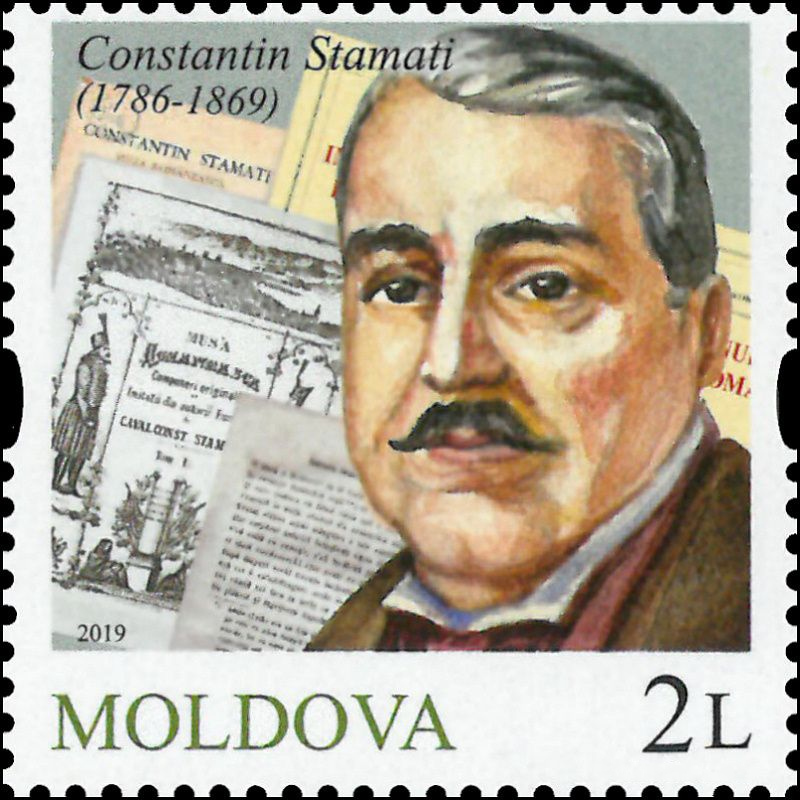
- Stamati on a 2019 stamp of Moldova
- Born: 1786; Iași, Moldavia (now Romania)
- Died: 12 September 1869 (aged 82–83); Ocnița, Russian Empire (now Moldova)

Constantin Stamati (1786 – 12 September 1869) was a Moldavian writer and translator. Born in the Principality of Moldavia, he settled in Chișinău, Bessarabia (presently in Moldova) after the 1812 partition of Moldavia by the Russian Empire at the end of the Russo-Turkish War.

Stamati became a civil servant and official translator under the first Russian administration of the region. He was rewarded by the Russian emperor with the Medal of Saint Anne and became a knight of that order.

He made the acquaintance of the Russian poet Alexander Pushkin at the time of latter's exile to Chișinău in 1820–1823. Stamati's most important work, Povestea poveștilor ("The Tale of Tales"), an idealized description of Moldavia's beginnings in verse, was published in Iași in 1843. His other works include contemporary satires and glorifications of Moldavia's past.

In 1866, he became one of the founding members of the Romanian Academy.
