= Alexandru Plămădeală =

Moldovan sculptor

Alexandru Plamădeală
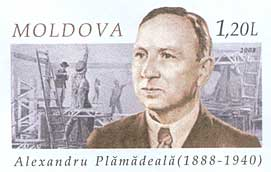
- 2003 stamp of Moldova
- Born: October 9, 1888; Sectorul Buiucani, Chișinău, Bessarabia Governorate, Russian Empire
- Died: April 15, 1940 (aged 51); Chișinău, Kingdom of Romania
- Resting place: Chișinău Central Cemetery
- Notable work: Stephen the Great Monument

Alexandru Plamădeală (9 October 1888 – 15 April 1940) was a Moldovan sculptor. He was the artist responsible for the creation of the Stephen the Great Monument in Chișinău (1927).

He graduated from the Moscow School of Painting, Sculpture and Architecture.

Alexandru Plamădeală married Olga Suceveanu on September 19, 1923.

He died in Chișinău in 1940.

== Former students ==
- Claudia Cobizev

== Gallery ==
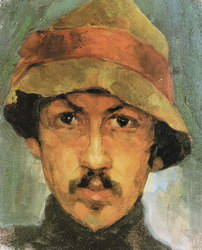
Self-portrait, 1918

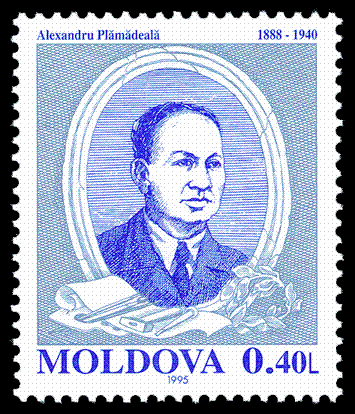
1995 stamp of Moldova

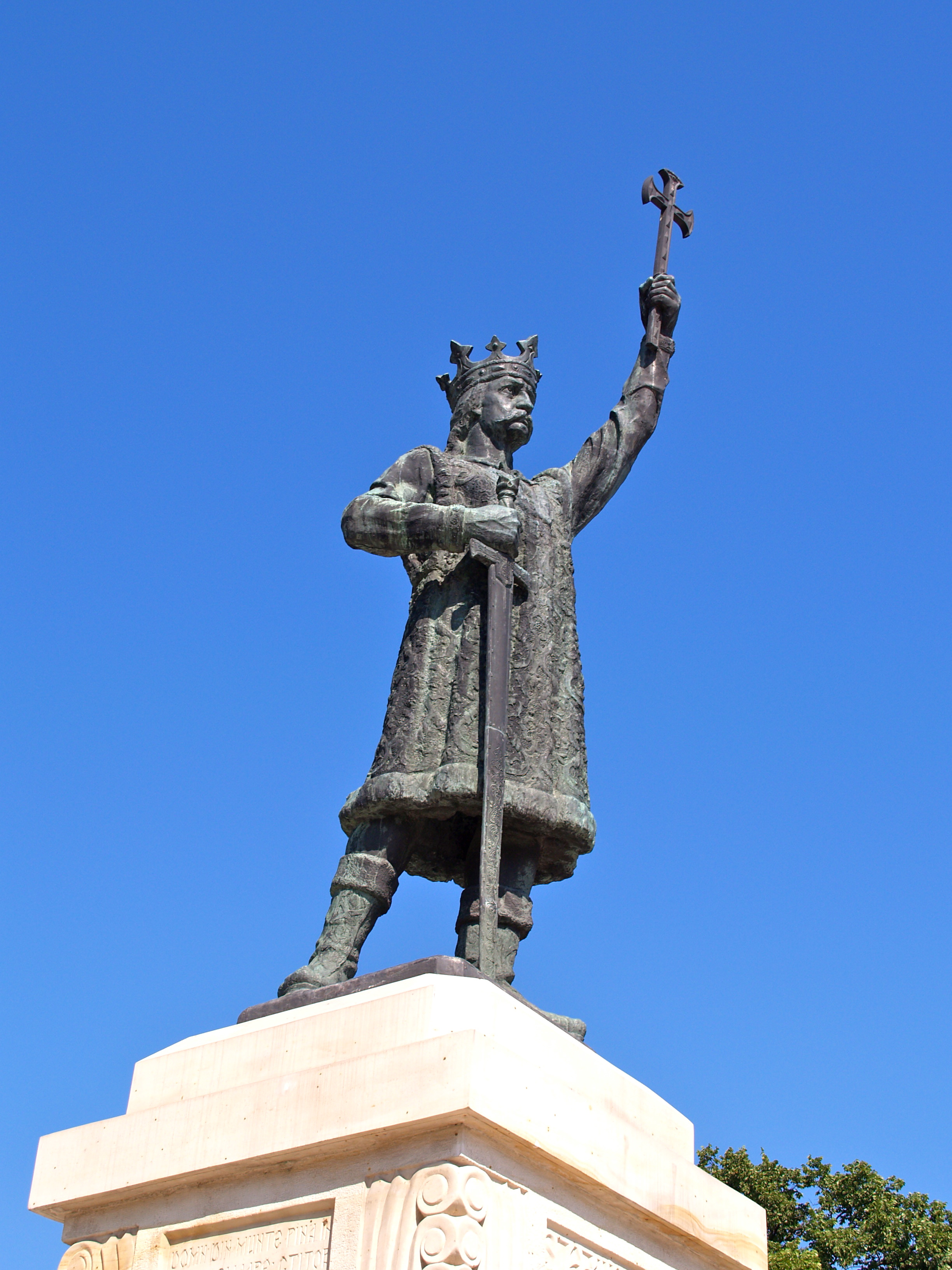
Stephen the Great Monument
