= Bristol Hotel, Odesa =

Hotel in Odesa, Ukraine

Bristol Hotel
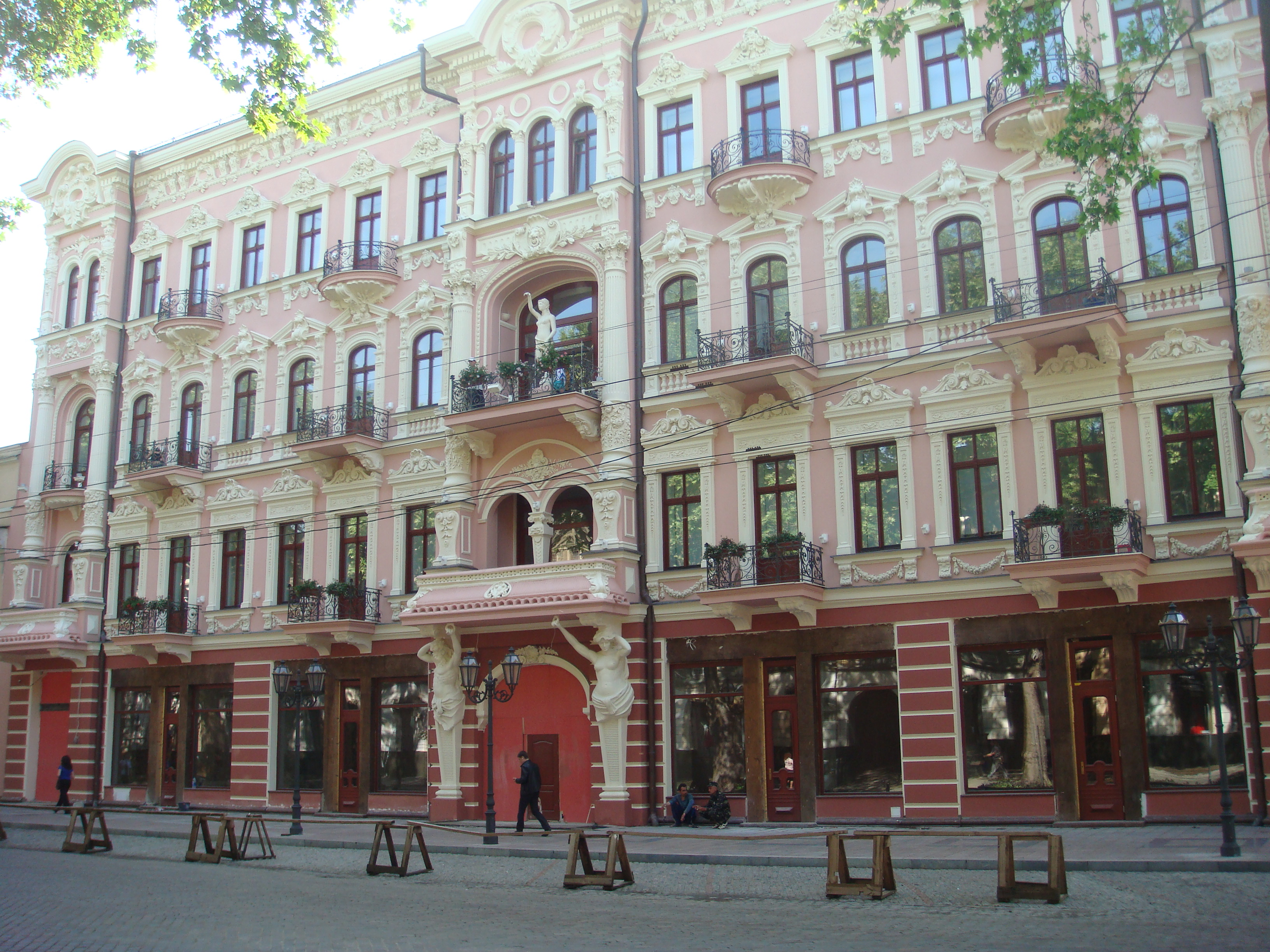
- Bristol Hotel
- Interactive map of the Bristol Hotel area

General information
- Location: Odesa, Ukraine, 15 Italiiska Street
- Coordinates: 46°28′52″N 30°44′34″E
- Opening: 1899

Design and construction
- Architects: Alexander Bernardazzi & Adolf Minkus

Other information
- Number of rooms: 113

Website
- Hotel web site

Immovable Monument of Local Significance of Ukraine
- Official name: Готель “Брістоль” арх. О.Й.Бернардацці Готель «Красная», де жили: -у січні 1926 р. великий американський письменник Теодор Драйзер; -у 1929 р. французький письменник Анрі Барбюс; -у 1940 р. італійський письменник Джовані Джермането; -22-25 травня 1941 р. німецький письменник Віллі Бредель; -8-21 жовтня 1935 р. німецький письменник-антифашист Фрідрих Вольф; - у 1925 р. поет Демьян Бєдний (Bristol Hotel arch. A. I. Bernadazzi, Krasnaya Hotel, where resided: in January, 1926: the great American writer Theodore Dreiser; in 1929: French writer Henri Barbusse; in 1940: Italian writer Giovanni Germaneto; on 22–25 May 1941: German writer Willi Bredel; on 21 October 1935: German anti-fascist writer Friedrich Wolf; in 1925: writer Demyan Bedny)
- Type: Architecture, Urban Planning, History
- Reference no.: 29-Од

Bristol Hotel (Ukrainian: Бристоль) is a hotel in Odesa, Ukraine. Built between 1898 and 1899, it is located in the city centre in Italiiska Street, opposite the Odesa Philharmonic Theater.

== Description ==
This stylish four-star 19th century hotel belongs to the same company as the nearby four-star Londonskaya Hotel which is roughly half the size.

== History ==
The hotel was designed in a mixed Renaissance Revival and Baroque Revival Victorian style, with Neoclassical statues and white marble columns facing the street. It has 113 rooms and is one of the city's notable landmarks.

The hotel was built between 1898 and 1899 to designs by architects Alexander Bernadazzi and Adolf Minkus and named the Bristol Hotel. Bernadazzi was an influential architect in Odesa at the time and the style of buildings in Odesa is assigned to him in particular. The name of the Bristol Hotel is thought to emblematic of luxury as another hotel built at that time was named the Hotel London.

After the Soviet revolution, the hotel closed in 1917. It sat vacant for some time, eventually serving as offices from 1922 to 1925. It reopened in 1928, but in the Soviet Union it seemed inappropriate for the hotel to be named after the city of Bristol in England, so it was renamed the Hotel Krasnaya (meaning "Red" in Russian) for the Red banner of the Revolution. The hotel closed in 2002 and underwent a lengthy restoration, reopening under its original name on December 15, 2010.

On 31 January 2025, the hotel was hit with a ballistic missile during the Russian invasion of Ukraine, injuring at least 7 people.

== Gallery ==
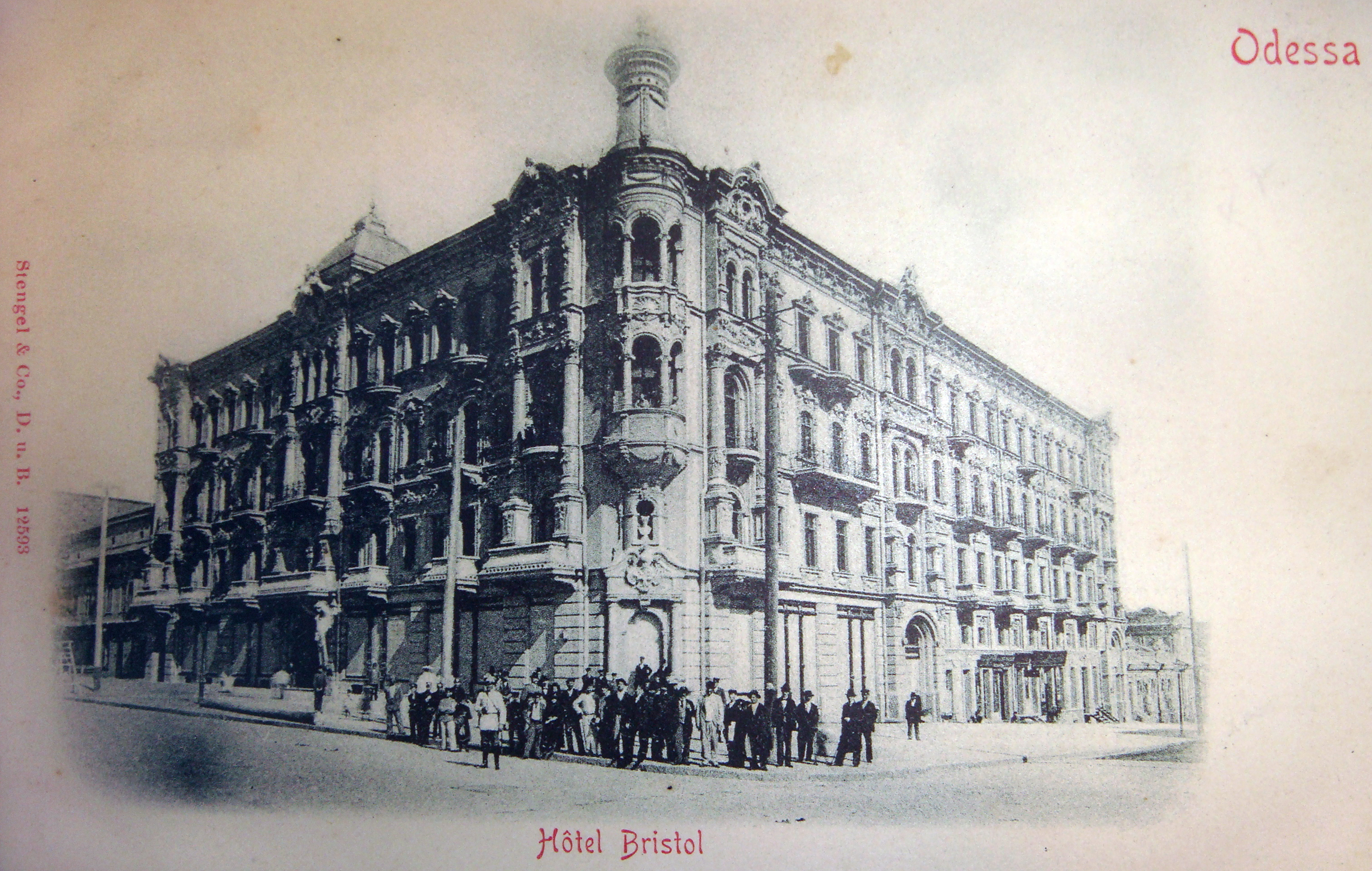
Bristol Hotel in 1899

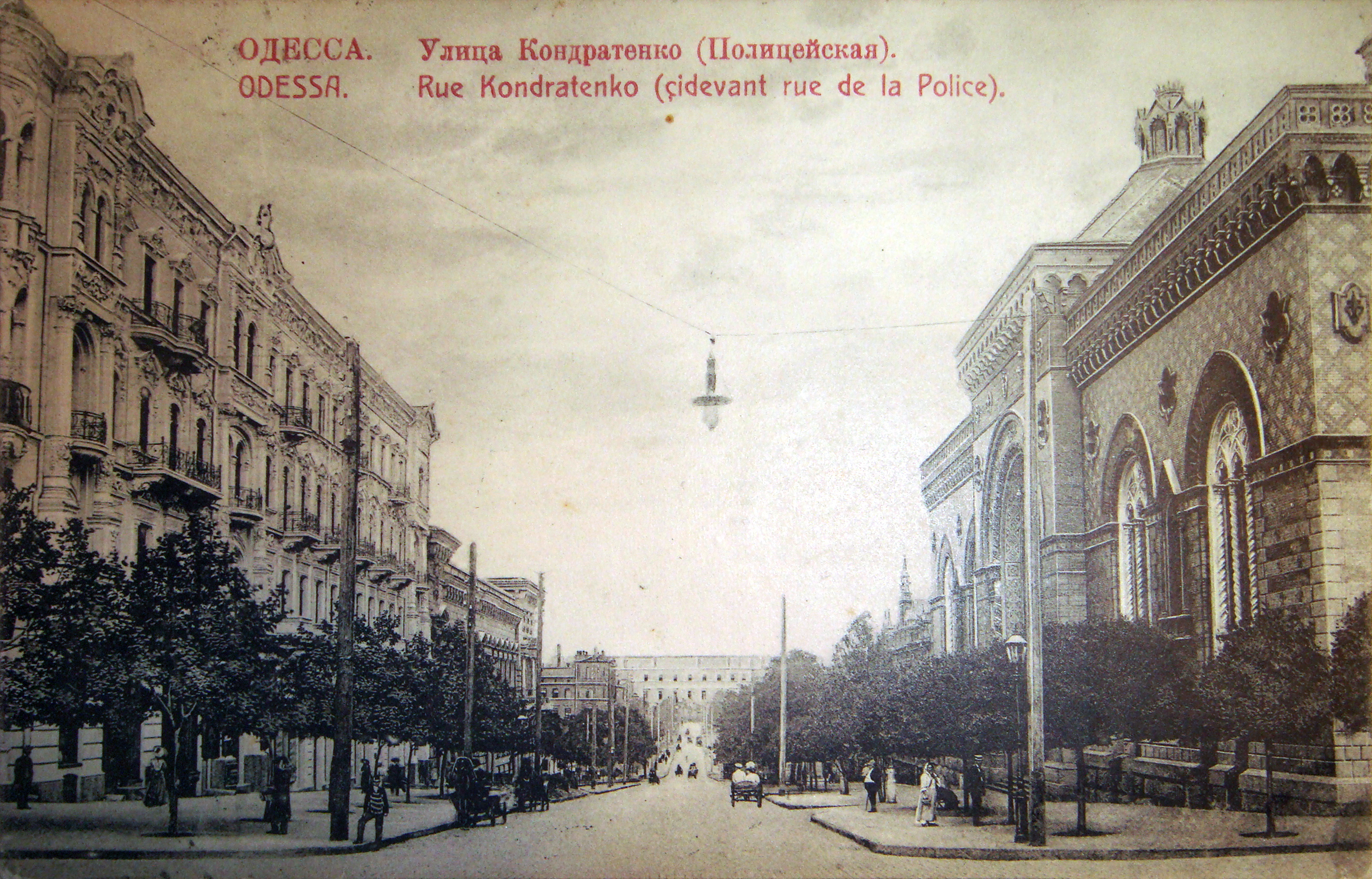
View at the beginning of 20th century

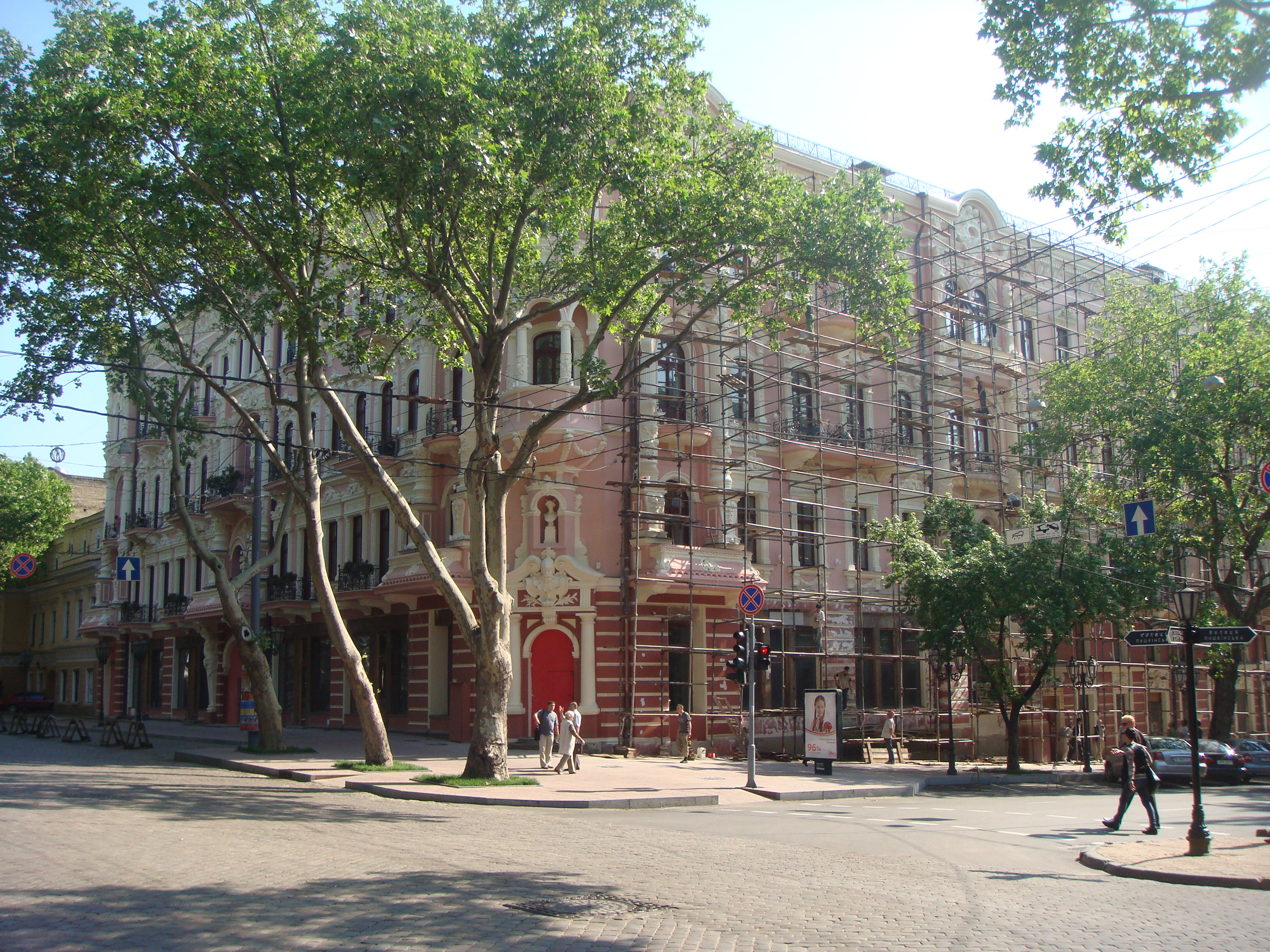
View of Bristol Hotel in May 2010

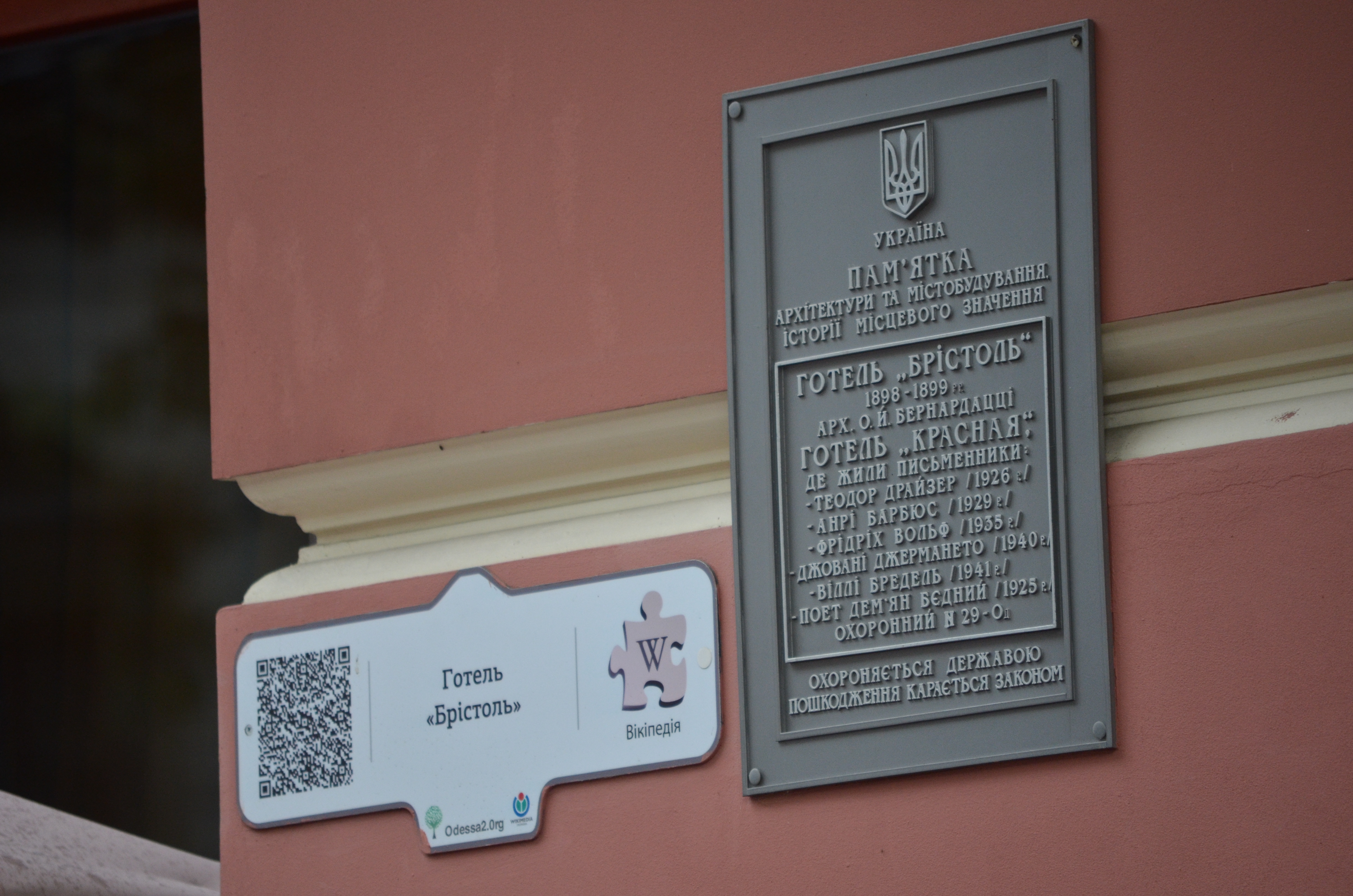
Code QRpedia on hotel, 2014
