= Maraslis House =

Maraslis's House
- Будинок Маразлі
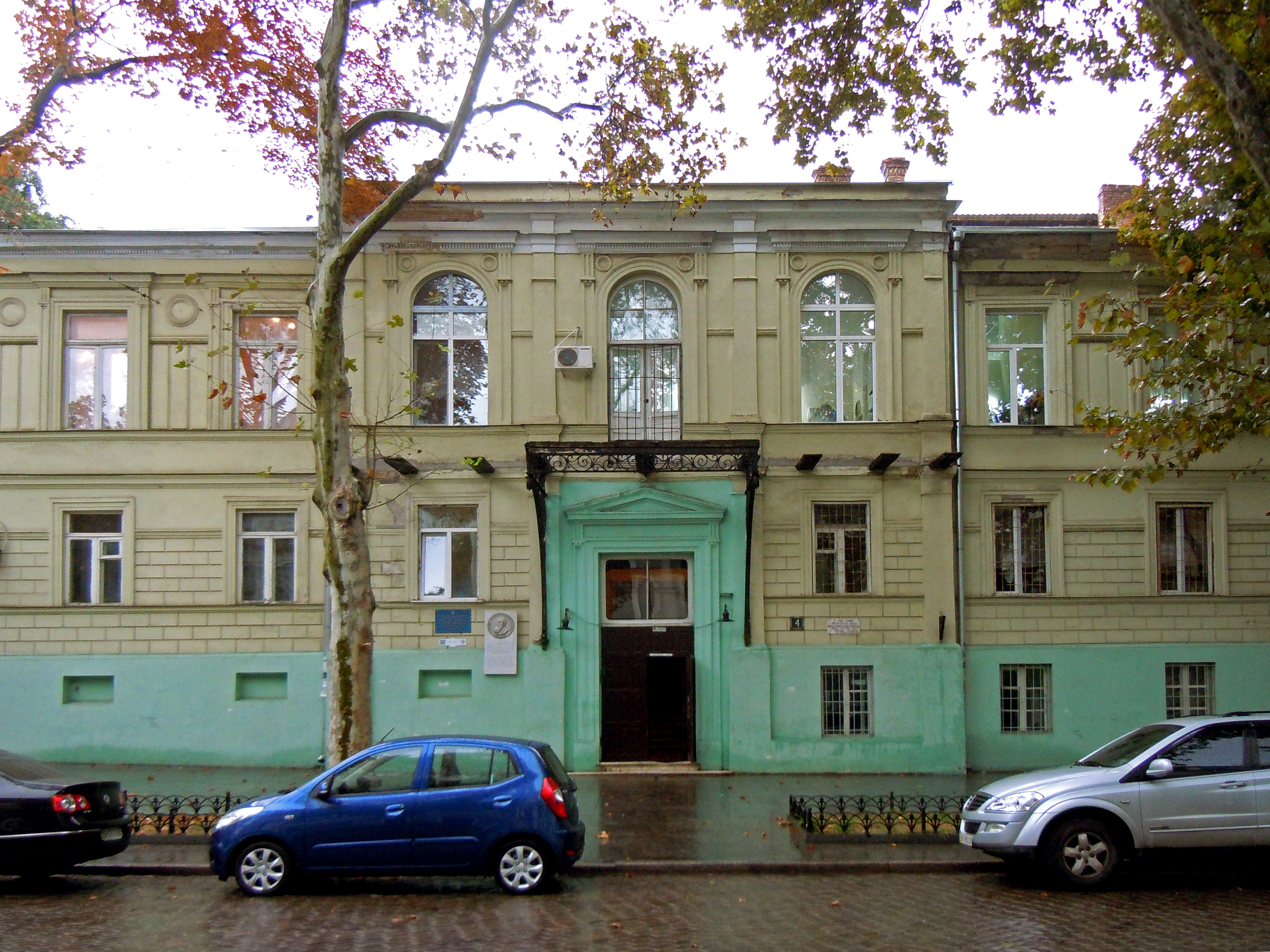
- view of the building
- Interactive map of the Maraslis's House area

General information
- Architectural style: Empire style, Classicism
- Location: Italiiska Street, 4, Odesa, Ukraine
- Coordinates: 46°29′2.99″N 30°44′34.09″E
- Opened: 1856
- Client: Grigorios Maraslis

Design and construction
- Architect: Ludwig Otton

Immovable Monument of Local Significance of Ukraine
- Official name: Будинок житловий Маразлі (арх. Оттон Л.Ц.), у якому жив Маразлі Г.Г. – одеський міський голова (Maraslis's Residential House (arch. Otton L.T.), where Marasli G. G., the mayor of Odesa, lived)
- Type: Architecture, Urban Planning, History
- Reference no.: 688-Од

Maraslis's House is at 4 Italiiska Street in Odesa.

== History ==
The house was the home of Grigorios Maraslis who was the Mayor of Odesa. He lived here from 1831 to 1907. The house had belonged to his father (1780–1853) who had the same name. It is not known who is the architect, but his father had bought this house in the 1820s.

During the Soviet era the house had a number of uses including as a hospital and an Oncology centre.

The building has a plaque outside that notifies visitors of its significance. There is also a QRpedia code that links to this article.
