= Fesenko printing house =

Building in Odesa

The building of the Fesenko printing house, built in the Russian-Byzantine style with features of the 17th century baroque, still remains an adornment of the Richelievskaya, though its architecture is rare and atypical for Odesa. The reconstruction of the building for the printing house was supervised by the synodal architect Lev Prokopovich, and the superstructure of the third floor in 1899 was directed by Alexander Bernardazzi.

The house was built in 1841 by the architect Ivan Kozlov and belonged to Major General Alexander Shnel. In the second half of the 1880s, the building was acquired by Efim Fesenko as a printing house.

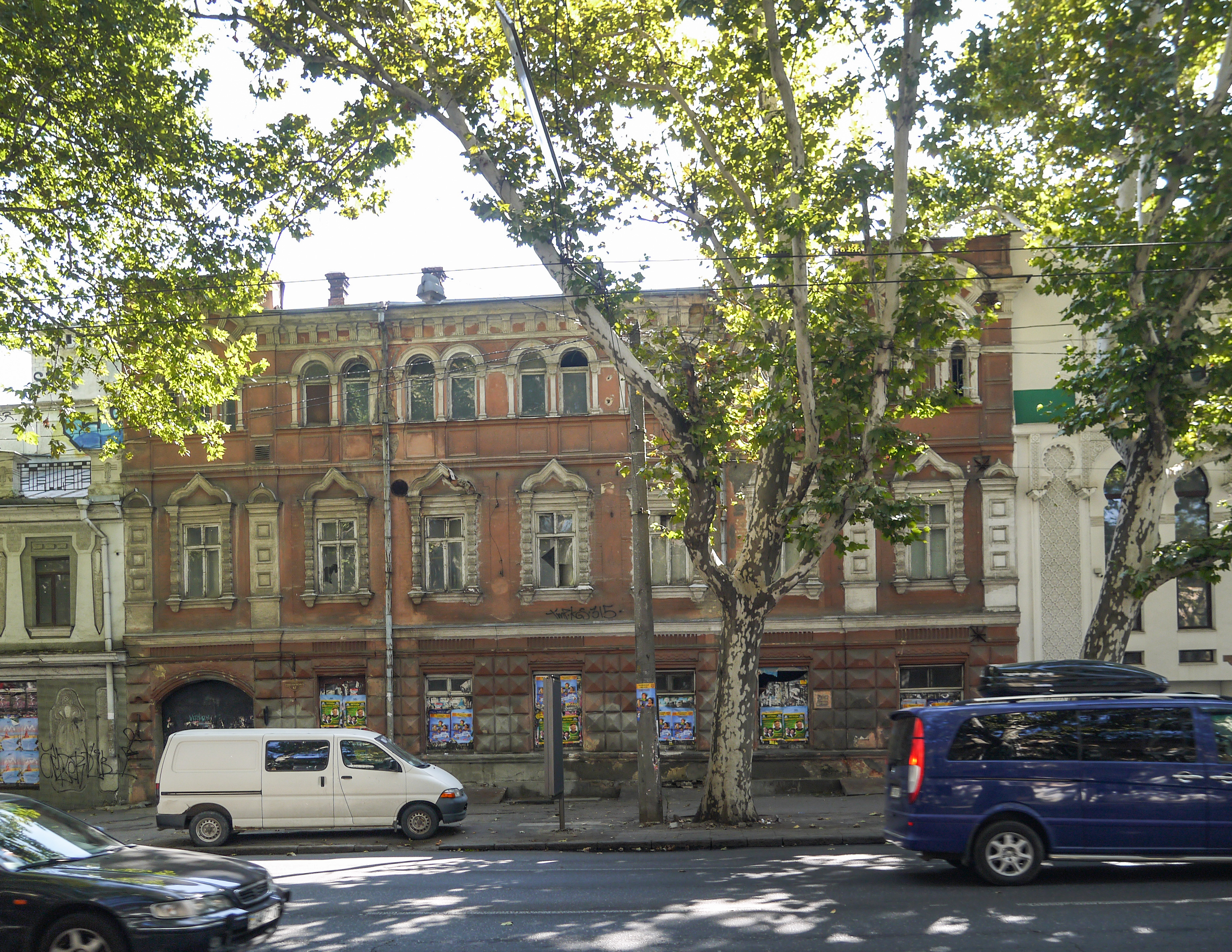
Fesenko Printing House

Efim Fesenko was a native of the Chernihiv Cossacks, and in 1869 walked to Odesa to work. In 1883 he opened his own printing house. Already in 1893, Efim Fesenko was recognized as an exemplary printer in the south of Russia, and his company was known outside of the empire. Four years later, at the Milan World Exhibition, Fesenko received the first prize for the lithographs presented. In total, the printing house has received four international awards.

Efim Fesenko was one of the first in the country to publish books for readers from among the people. The printing house printed a wide variety of products: books - from luxurious publications to brochures, icons, small images, lined notebooks. In addition, Efim Fesenko published large amounts of Ukrainian literature, and after the revolution, banknotes of the Ukrainian People's Republic were printed in his printing house.

The building of the Fesenko printing house is a monument of cultural heritage.
