= St. Teodora de la Sihla Church =

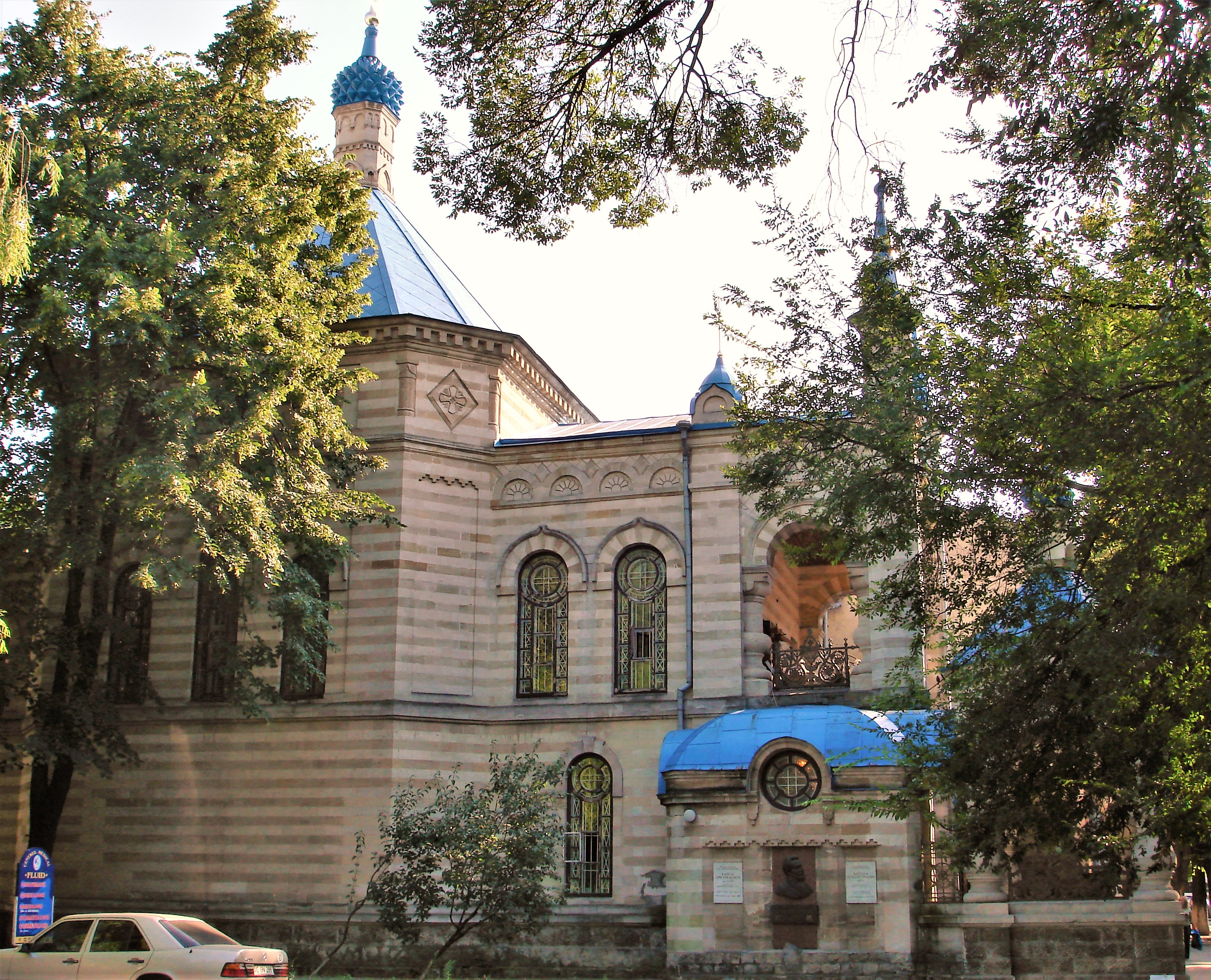
- St. Teodora de la Sihla Church
- 47°1′15″N 28°49′49″E
- Location: Central Chișinău
- Country: Moldova
- Denomination: Eastern Orthodox

History
- Status: Church
- Founder(s): Teodor Krupensky and Eufrosinia Veazemsky
- Dedication: Theodora of Sihla
- Consecrated: 1922

Architecture
- Functional status: Cathedral of the Metropolis of Bessarabia
- Architect: Alexander Bernardazzi
- Style: Byzantine style
- Completed: 1895

The St. Teodora de la Sihla Church (Romanian: Biserica Sfânta Teodora de la Sihla) is a cathedral in Central Chișinău, Moldova. It functions as the cathedral of the Metropolis of Bessarabia.

== Overview ==
Formerly the chapel of a girls gymnasium, the church of St. Teodora de la Sihla was designed by architect Alexander Bernardazzi. It features elements of neo-classic Byzantine architecture.

== Gallery ==
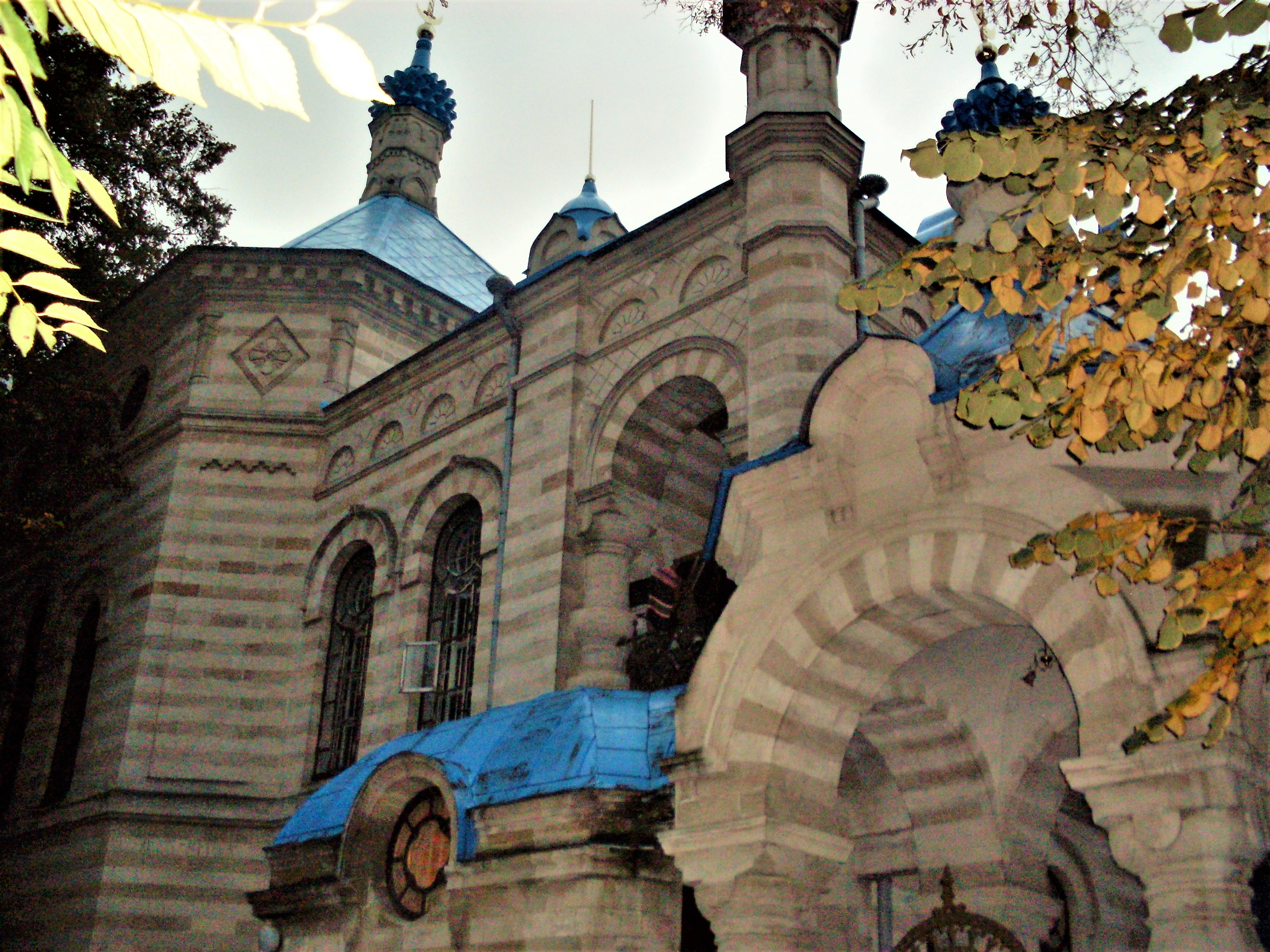

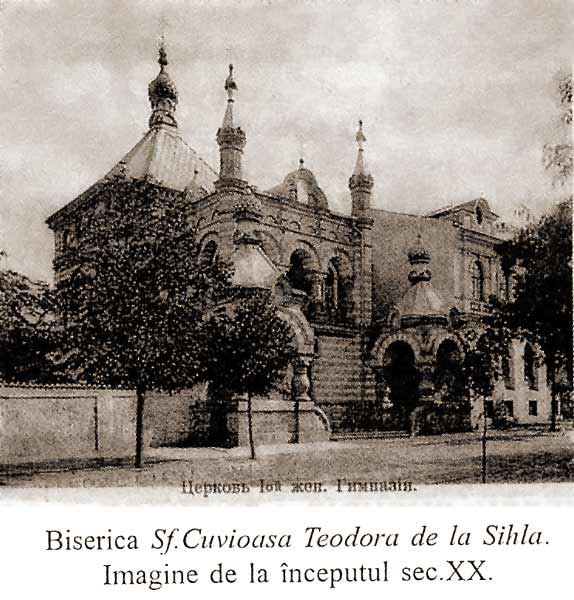

== See also ==
- Metropolis of Bessarabia
