= Museum of Foreign Writers in Odesa =

Biographical museum in Odesa, Ukraine

Coordinates: 46.4817°N 30.7431°E

- Музей «Іноземні письменники в Одесі»
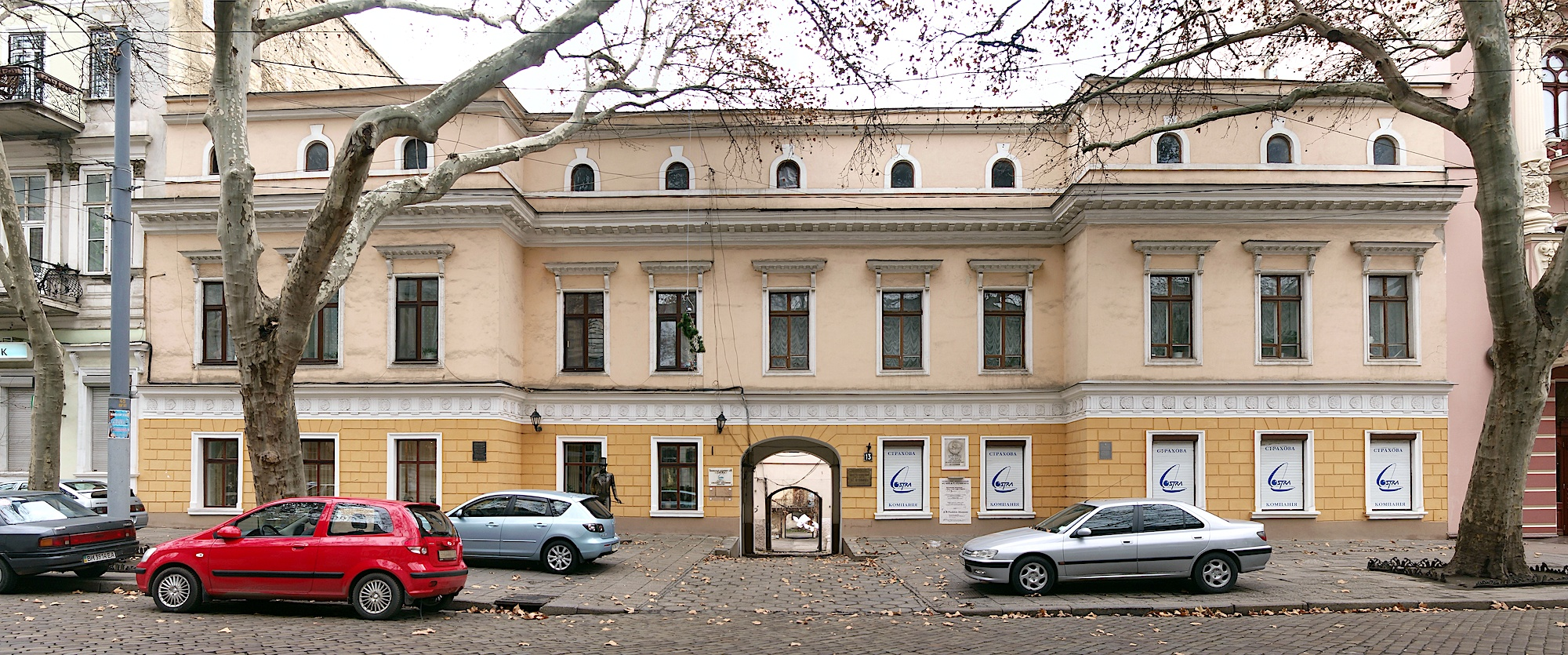
- Odesa Pushkin Museum
- Established: 1961
- Location: 13, Italiiska Street, Odesa
- Website: museum-literature.odessa.ua/museum/pushkin

Immovable Monument of Local Significance of Ukraine
- Official name: Будинок (Сікарда) (“Готель дю норд”) (House (of Sicard) ("Hotel du Nord"))
- Type: Architecture, Urban Planning
- Reference no.: 28-Од

The Museum of Foreign Writers in Odesa, (Note: Ukrainian: Музей «Іноземні письменники в Одесі») or Odesa Pushkin Museum (Russian: Одесский музей Александра Пушкина), is a museum dedicated, among others, to the Russian poet Alexander Pushkin in Odesa, Ukraine.

== Description ==
The museum is in an apartment where Pushkin lived in 1823. Pushkin only spent thirteen months in the city. He arrived because he had been exiled from Moscow. Whilst he was here he seems to have enjoyed himself but the local governor was not pleased. Irritated by Pushkin's behaviour he had his mail intercepted. He managed to find passages in letters that supported atheism and with these he was able to get the Tsar to ban Pushkin from Odesa as well.

The museum displays original manuscripts from Pushkin's writings, and a copy of a page from his book Eugene Onegin. It was opened in June, 1961.

== See also ==
- Demolition of monuments to Alexander Pushkin in Ukraine
