= Theodora of Sihla =

Romanian Orthodox saint

Saint Theodora of Sihla
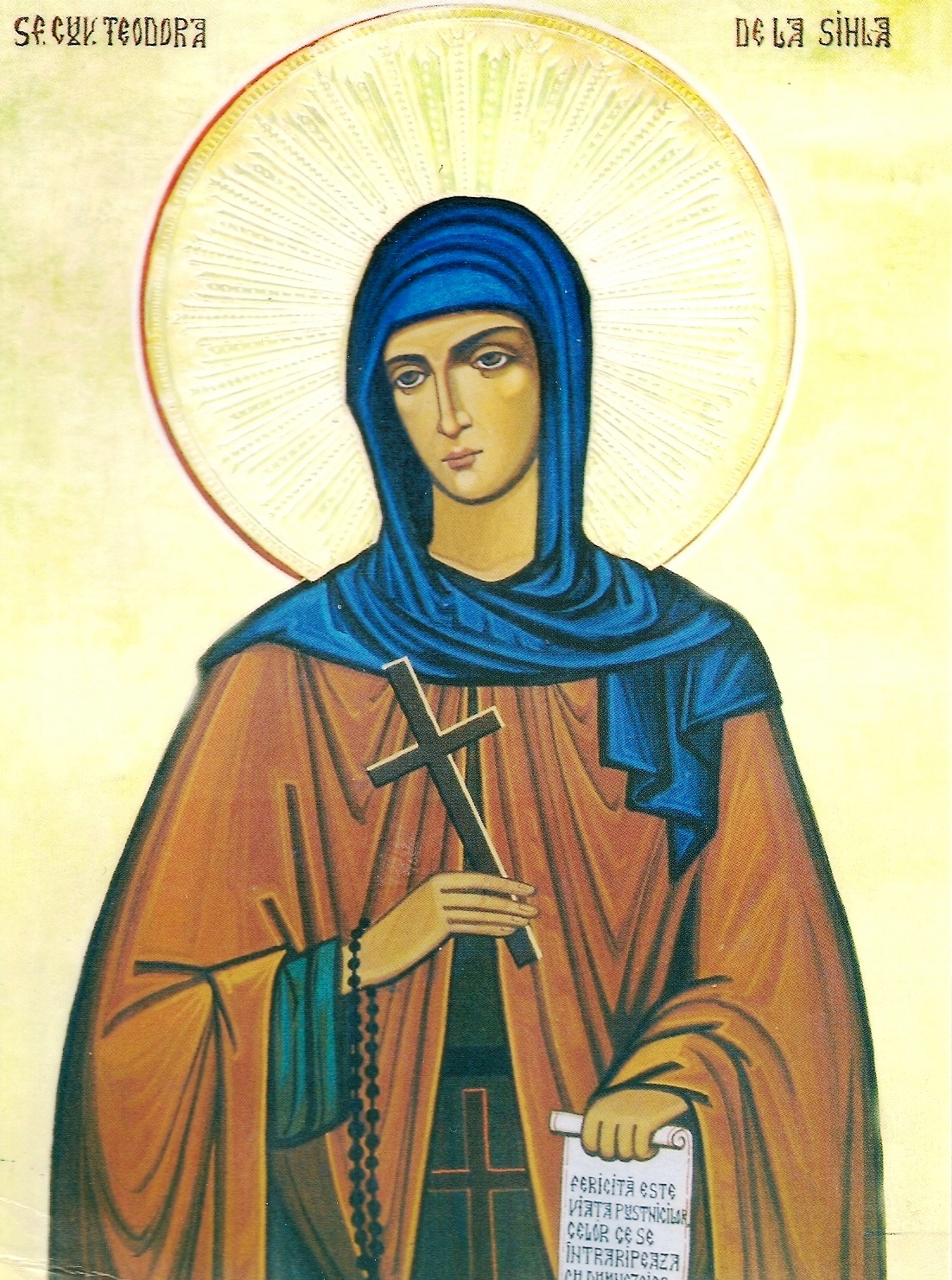

Venerable
- Venerated in: Eastern Orthodox Church
- Canonized: 1992 by Romanian Orthodox Church
- Major shrine: Pechersk Lavra
- Feast: 7 August
- Patronage: St Theodora of Sihla Cathedral; Church of Saint Theodora Sihla, Sihastria Monastery

Theodora of Sihla, Teodora or Bohdanna of the Carpathians (Romanian: Sfânta Cuvioasă Teodora de la Sihla; c. 1650 – ?) is a Christian ascetic and Romanian Orthodox saint, commemorated on 7 August.

== Life ==
Born in Vânători-Neamț, Neamț County during the reign of Vasile Lupu, she was the daughter of the chief armourer of Neamț Citadel, the boyar Ștefan Joldea. In her youth, she was married off against her will. Being childless, both she and her husband decide to embrace monasticism, he withdrawing to Poiana Mărului Monastery under the name Elfterie, and she to Vărzărești Monastery.

Foreign invasions prompt her to retreat into the Buzău Mountains (she is said to have also passed through the woodland hermitage Fundătura), where she lived for nearly a decade (her name is mentioned in an inscription on the altar stone of the woodland hermitage at New Agaton). From here she went firstly to Neamț Monastery, where she was guided towards Sihăstria hermitage, in the Neamț Mountains. With the guidance of Sihăstria's abbot, and with the blessing of the hermitage's egumen, she ascended the mountains to become an anchorite in the Sihla wilderness. The word "sihlă" means thick forest of young trees; thicket. Over a century later, Calistrat Hogaș described the hermit's environment:

"Dacă Sihla nu pășește dincolo de marginile firești, apoi are cel puțin însușirea de a atinge aproape culmea de asprime, singurătate și sălbăticie a celei mai puternice închipuiri."

"If Sihla does not surpass earthly imagination, it is about as harsh, lonely, and wild a place as one could possibly conceive."

Theodora initially lived in a cottage in a rocky part of Sihla, left to her by an elderly monk. Oral tradition recounts that nuns fleeing from foreign invasions came across the saint's cottage, who relinquished it to move into a cave, even more remote than her initial abode.

Father Anthony and Hierodeacon Laurence from the Sihăstria hermitage visited her just after the year 1700 and held confession and communion; she died shortly afterwards.

== Posthumous legacy ==
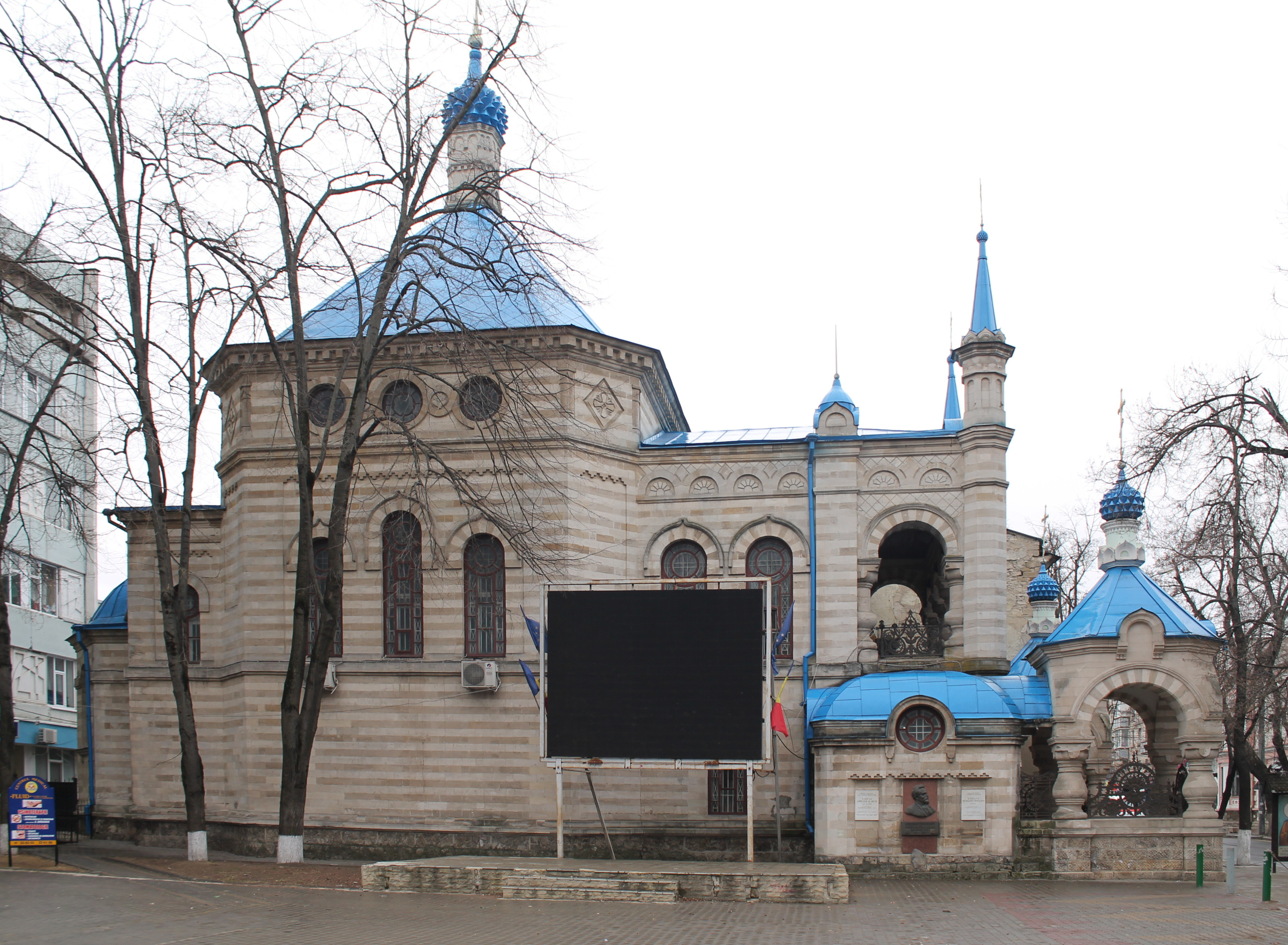
Church dedicated to saint Theodora of Sihla in Chișinău, Moldova.

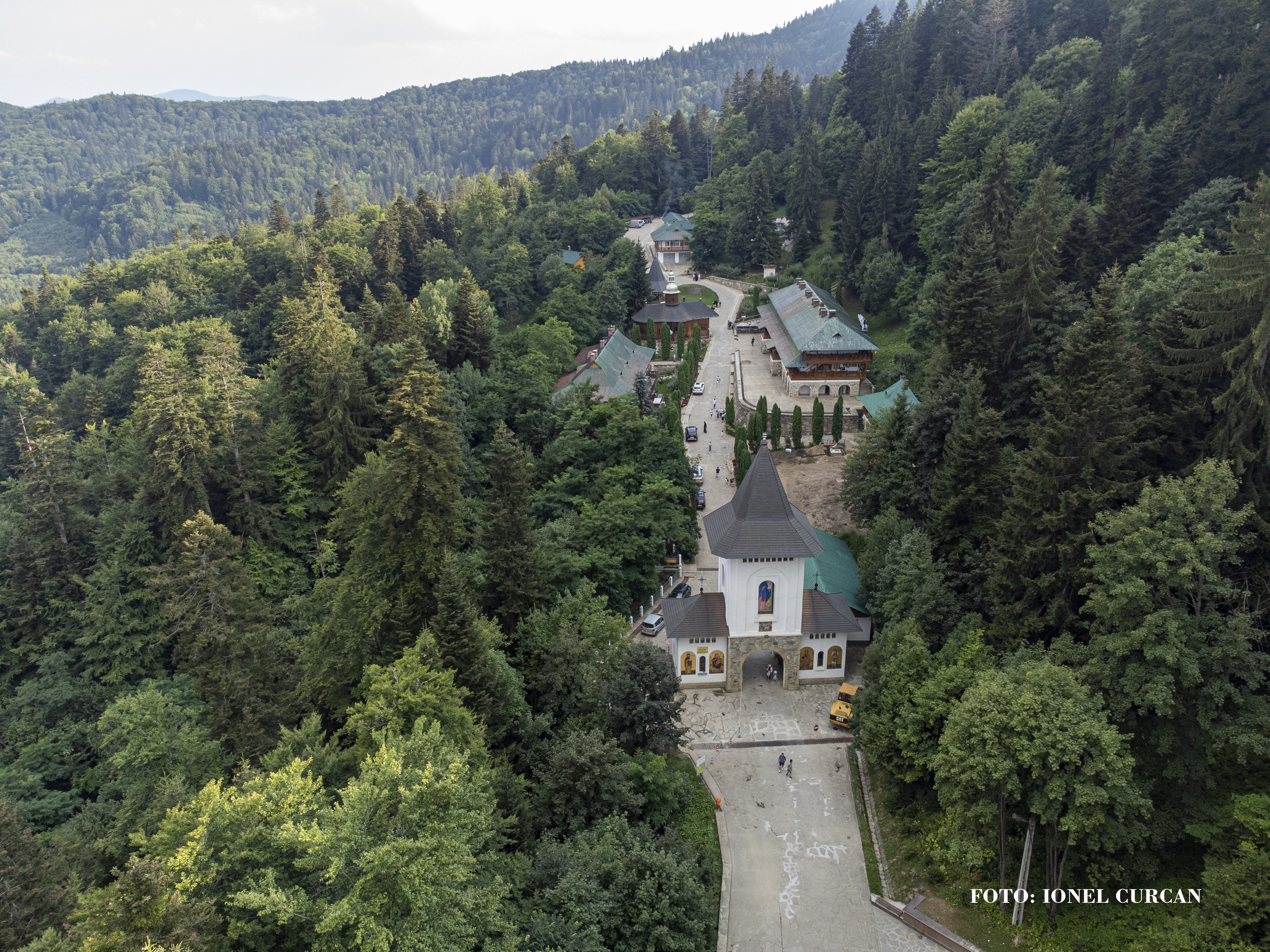
Sihla Monastery

After her death, the body of the St. Theodora remained in the cave in which she had spent the greater part of her hermitage. The knowledge of her life and death is said to have reached her husband, who left Poiana Mărului and came to spend the last decade of his life at Sihăstria, close to his wife's resting place. Around 1725, Sihla Monastery was founded in her memory.

She remained buried there until circa 1828-1834 when, during the Russian occupation of the Romanian Principalities, she was translated to Pechersk Lavra in Kiev.

The Romanian writer Calistrat Hogaș wrote about her in his book "Pe drumuri de munte"("On mountain paths"):

Frumoasa Sfânta Teodora, legendara anahoretă a locurilor acestora, se înfățișa închipuirii mele ca o a doua Marie din Egipt, cu viața bântuită de aceleași nenorociri, tot ca și ea. Sfânta Teodora se lepădase, poate, de plăcerile îmbătătoare ale lumii acesteia, mulțumindu-se, în cele din urmă, cu crăpatura umedă a unei stânci, în locul palatelor aurite unde luxul și desfrâul domneau cu răsfățare...

Beautiful St. Teodora, the anchorite legend of these places, appeared in my imagination as a second Mary of Egypt, her life haunted by the same misfortunes. St. Teodora had also cast off, perhaps, the intoxicating pleasures of the world, contenting herself, at last, with the damp crevice of a rock, instead of the gilded palaces where luxury and indulgence reigned...

The Synod of the Romanian Orthodox Church proclaimed the canonization of St. Theodora of Sihla on 20 June 1992, establishing her commemoration on 7 August.

== Bibliography ==
- Sf. Cuvioasă Teodora de la Sihla - Viața și nevoințele, text preluat din Pr. Prof. Dr. Constantin Galeriu, Sfinți români și apărători ai Legii strămoșești, Editura - Institutului Biblic și de Misiune al Bisericii Ortodoxe Române, București, 1987, p. 432-442, Cuvioasa Teodora de la Sihla
- Dicționar Religios, Ion M. Stoian, Ed. Garamond, 1994
- Balan, Ioanichie, Sfânta Teodora de la Sihla, Editura Mănăstirea Sihăstria, 2004.
