= Grigorios Maraslis =

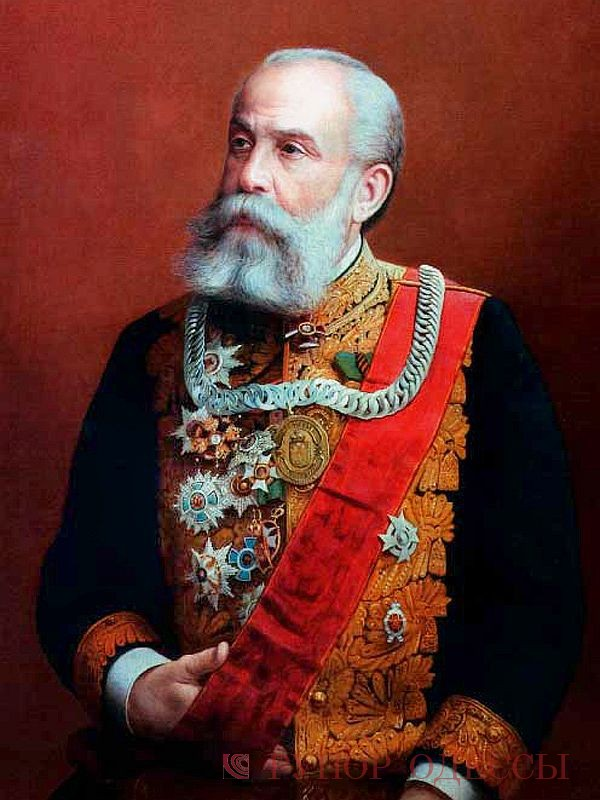
Portrait by Ivan Karchev, 1896

Grigorios Maraslis (Greek: Γρηγόριος Μαρασλής, Russian: Григорий Григорьевич Маразли; 25 July 1831 – 1 May 1907) was an official of the Russian Empire and long-time mayor of Odesa (1878–1895) of Greek origin. A noted philanthropist, he sponsored many buildings and educational institutions both in Odesa and in various cities in Greece and for the Greek communities of the Ottoman Empire. He was awarded Order of the Cross of Takovo and Order of Prince Danilo I.

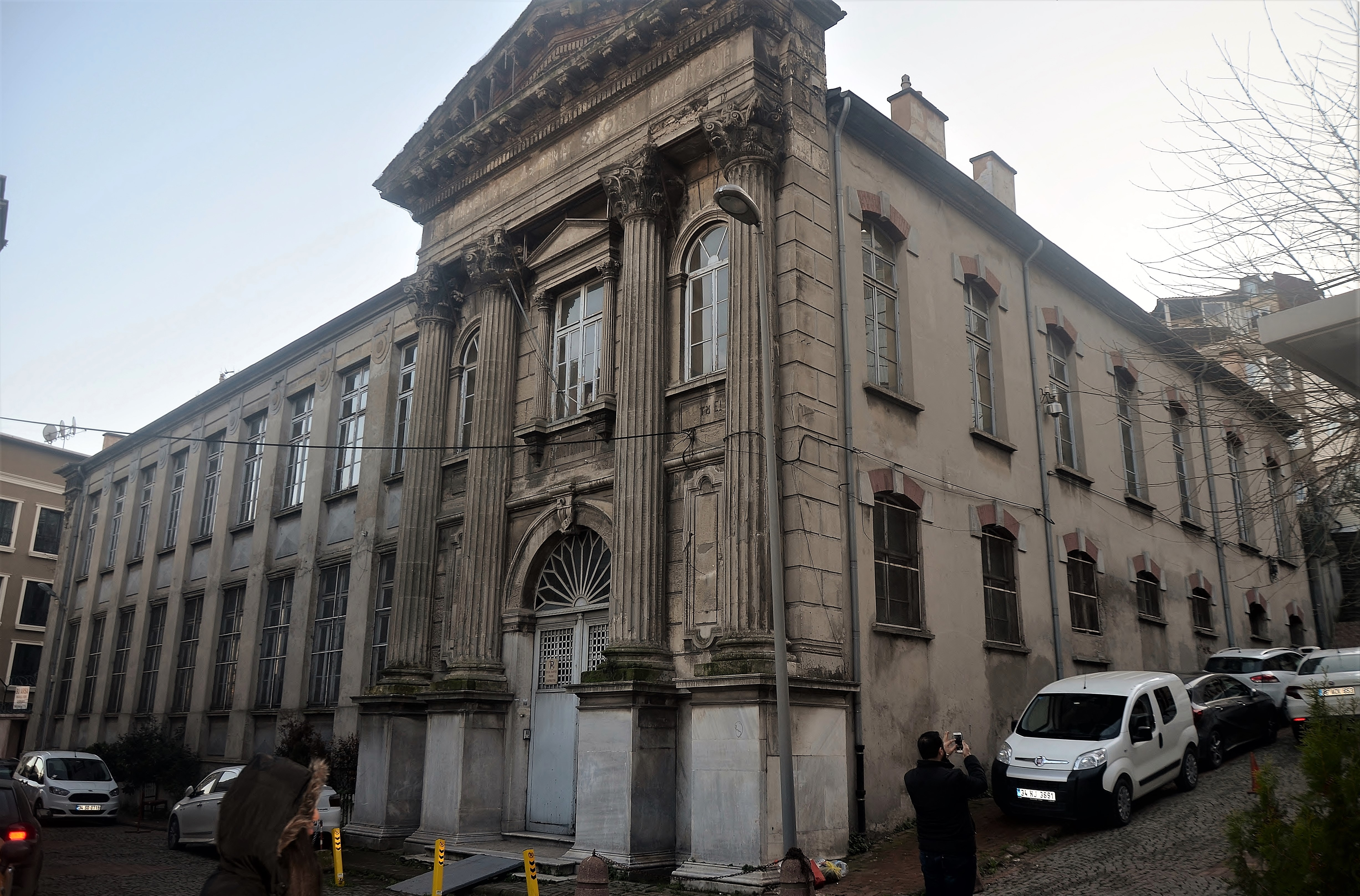
Maraşlı Greek Orthodox Primary School in Fener neighborhood of Fatih, Istanbul, Turkey. Built in the Ottoman era and funded by Grigorios Maraslis, it is not in use today

== See also ==
- Maraslis House, in Odesa
- Odesa Fine Arts Museum, donated by Maraslis
- Main building of the Athens University of Economics and Business, funded by Maraslis
