= Londonska Hotel =

Four-star hotel in Odesa, Ukraine

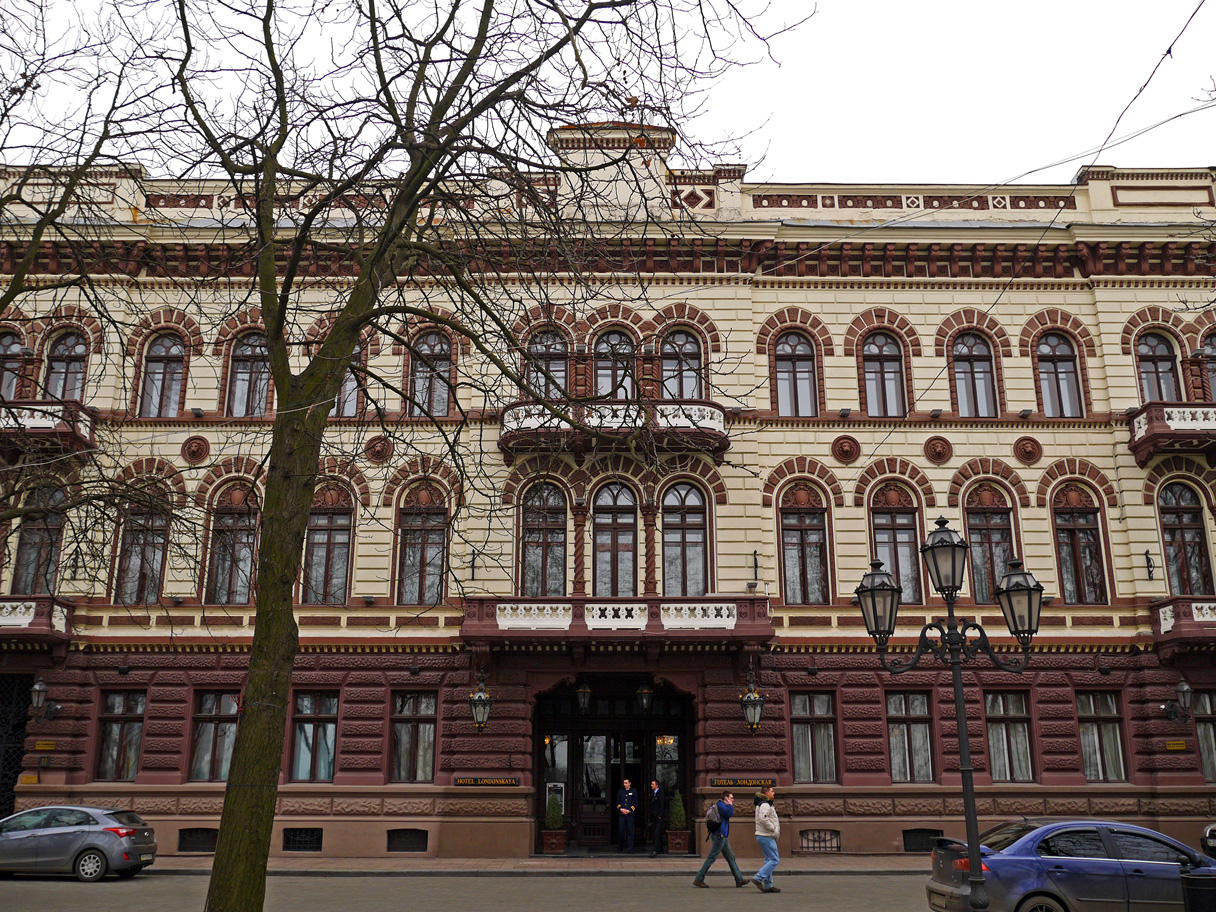
- Londonska Hotel

- Location within Ukraine

General information
- Location: Odesa, Ukraine, 11 Prymorskyi Blvd
- Coordinates: 46°29′13.01″N 30°44′31.16″E
- Opening: 1846

Design and construction
- Architect: Francesco Boffo

Other information
- Number of rooms: 67

Website
- londonska-hotel.com.ua/en/

The Londonska Hotel is a historic four star 19th century hotel in the center of Odesa, Ukraine, belonging to the same company as the nearby Bristol Hotel.

== Description ==
The stylish four star 19th century hotel is in the centre of Odesa. It belongs to the same company as the nearby five-star Bristol Hotel which is roughly twice the size.

== Early history ==
The building housing the Londonska Hotel was originally constructed between 1826 and 1828 as a private residence, designed by architect Francesco Boffo in the early Italian Renaissance style. The hotel was opened in 1846 by Jean-Batiste Karuta, a French confectioner. It was significantly remodeled from 1899 to 1900 by architect J.M. Dmitrenko, and renovated in 1988. The name of the hotel, like the nearby Bristol Hotel, is thought to have suggested luxury at that time.

== Famous guests ==
Famous guests of the hotel have included: Emperor Pedro II of Brazil, Anton Chekhov, Alexander Kuprin, Robert Louis Stevenson, Ivan Ayvazovsky, Henri Barbusse, Carl Gustaf Mannerheim, Theodore Dreiser, Louis Aragon, Elsa Triolet, Isadora Duncan, Marcello Mastroianni, Nikita Mikhalkov, Oleg Yankovsky, Vladimir Putin, Viktor Yushchenko, Leonid Kuchma, Jean Claude van Damme, Paolo Coelho.
