= Italiiska Street, Odesa =

Street in Odesa, Ukraine

Italiiska Street
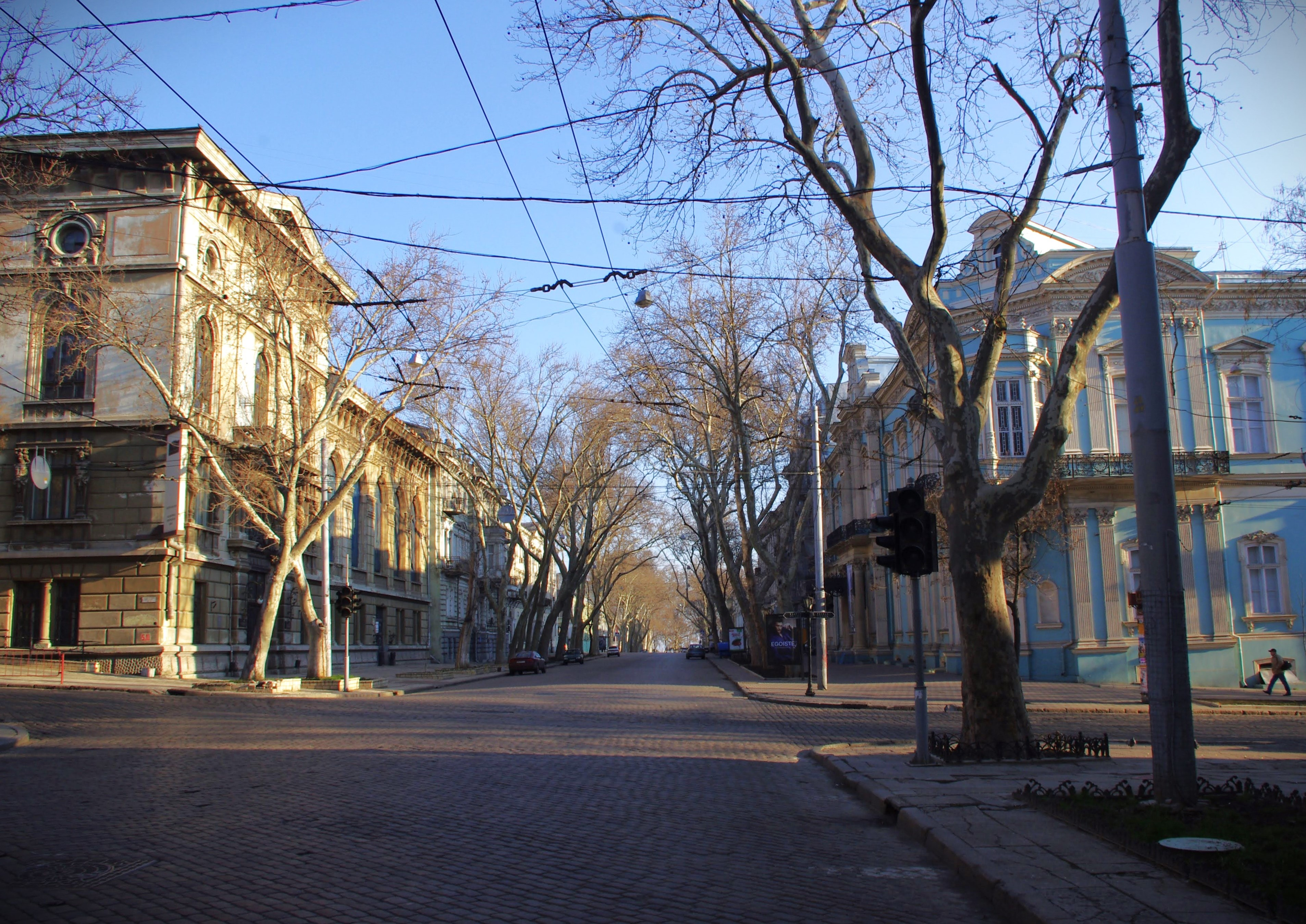
- Italiiska street in the direction of Opera Theater
- Interactive map of Italiiska Street
- Native name: Італійська (Ukrainian)
- Former name: Pushkinska
- Postal code: 65011, 65012, 65014, 65026
- Coordinates: 46°28′57″N 30°44′34.3″E
- From: 46.484842°N 30.743220°E
- To: 46.469496°N 30.740870°E

Construction
- Inauguration: 1827

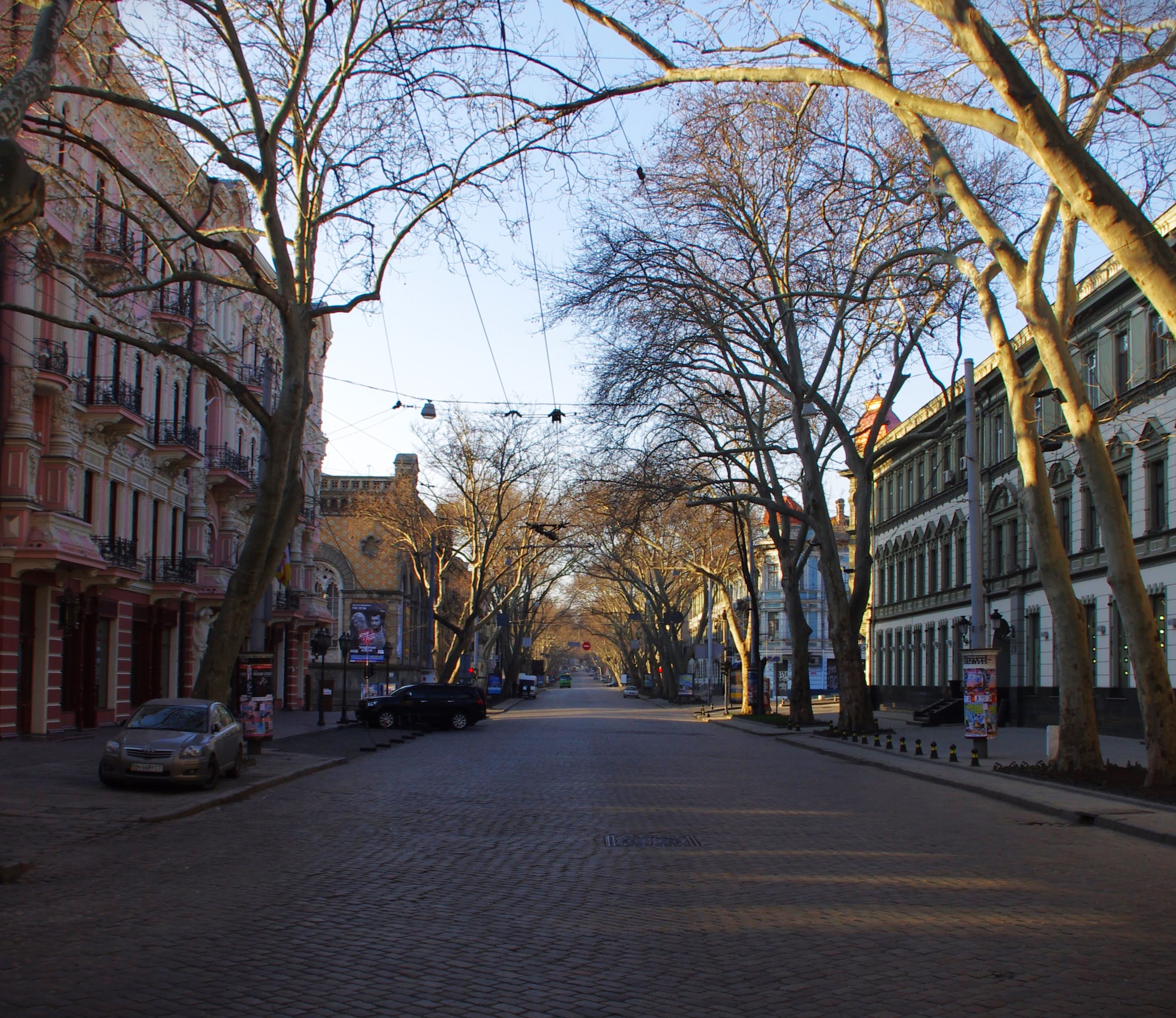
View of the street in the direction of Central Railway Station

Italiiska Street (Ukrainian: Італійська вулиця, lit. 'Italian Street') is a street in the downtown of Odesa, Ukraine. The street is named after Italy. The street was founded in 1827.

It was renamed to Pushkinska after Russian poet Alexander Pushkin on June 25, 1880, and the street kept this name until July 26, 2024. Although Pushkin lived in several different buildings at different times, the Museum of Pushkin (the branch of the Odesa Literature Museum) was organized at Italiiska Street 13. The statue of Pushkin was founded at the front of the building dedicating to the 200th-year jubilee of his birthday.

Many famous architecture monuments are located on the street; among them are Abaza Palace (now the Odesa Museum of Western and Eastern Art), the New Burse Building (now the Odesa Philharmonic Theater), and the Bristol Hotel.

On July 26, 2024, by order of the head of the Odesa regional state administration Oleh Kiper, Pushkinska Street was renamed to Italiiska Street to comply with derussification laws.

== Sources ==
- Одесса от А до Я. Пушкинская улица (in Russian)
- Ю. Парамонов. Пушкинская улица. Часть І (in Russian)
- Ю. Парамонов. Пушкинская улица. Часть ІІ (in Russian)
