= Alexander Bernardazzi =

Russian architect (1831–1907)

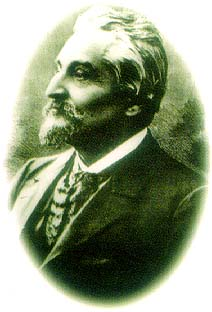
- Born: July 2, 1831; Pyatigorsk
- Died: 26 August [O.S. 13 August] 1907 (aged 76); Fastov
- Occupation: Architect
- Buildings: Chişinău City Hall; St. Teodora de la Sihla Church

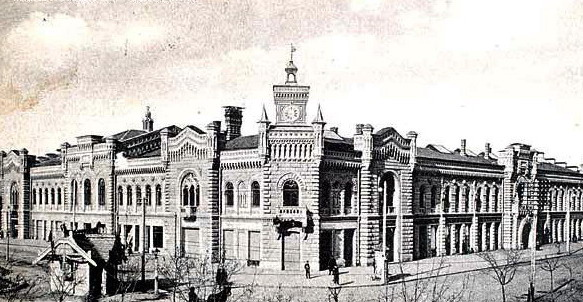
Chişinău City Hall

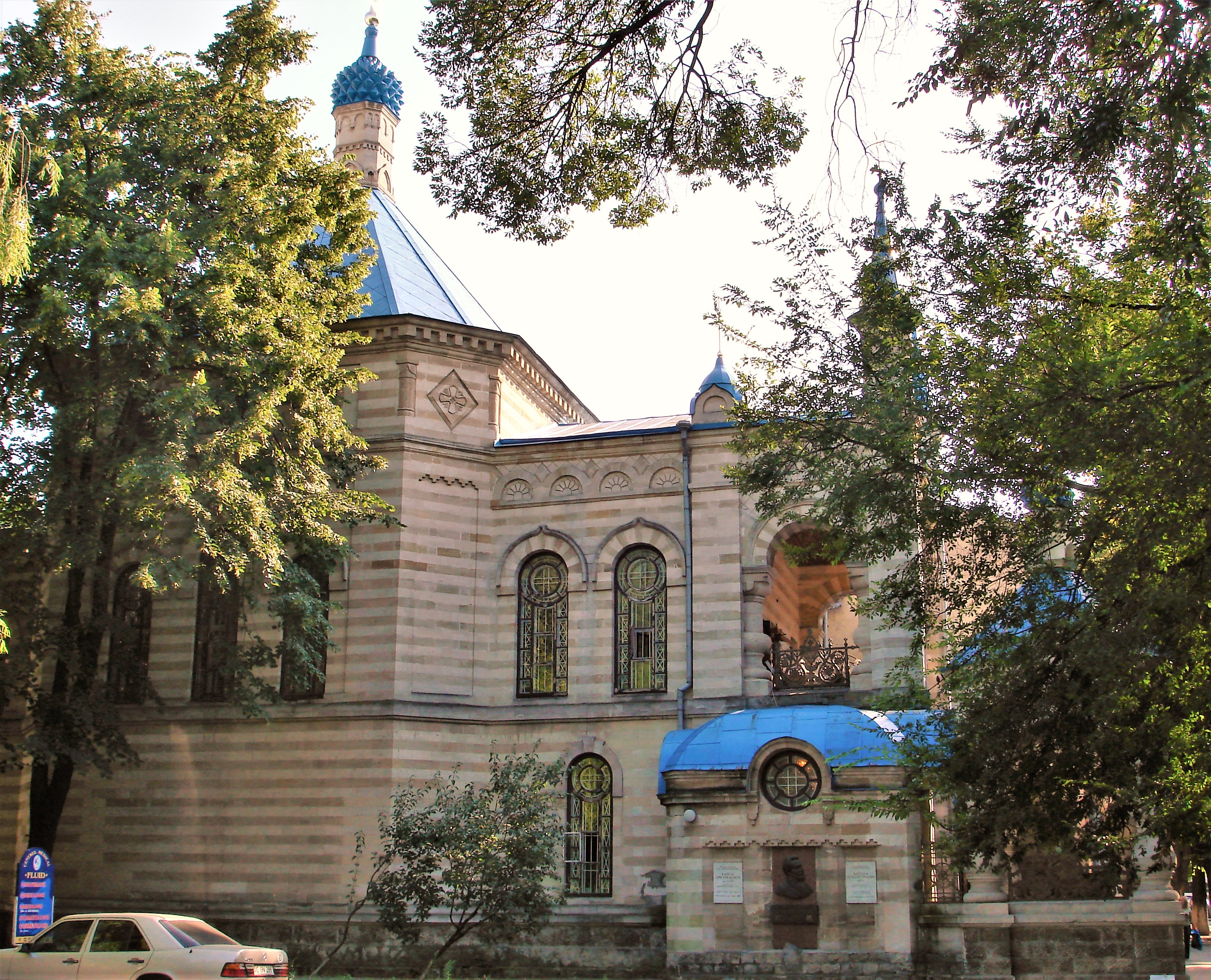
St. Teodora de la Sihla Church

Aleksander Osipovich Bernardazzi (Russian: Александр Осипович Бернардацци, alternative spelling: Alexandr Bernardacci, Romanian: Alexandru Bernardazzi; July 2, 1831 – August 14, 1907) was a Russian architect best known for his work in Odessa and Chişinău.

== His life ==
Bernardazzi was born in Pyatigorsk in 1831. The town had been almost completely built by his father, Giuseppe Marco Bernardazzi, and uncle, who were originally Swiss from Pambio. Very early Bernardazzi demonstrated artistic talent and was eventually sent to study in Moscow. His first architectural job was in Chişinău from 1856 to 1878, where he served as the city architect. In 1878 Bernardazzi moved to Odessa and lived there for over thirty years. In 1879 Bernardazzi became the Odessa city architect and in the mid-1880s he was appointed an architect at the Novaya Rossiya University in Odessa. It has been said that "the Odessa you see today is the work of this prodigious and talented architect".

Bernardazzi died August 14, 1907, in Fastiv. He was buried beside his mother in Chişinău.

== Major work ==
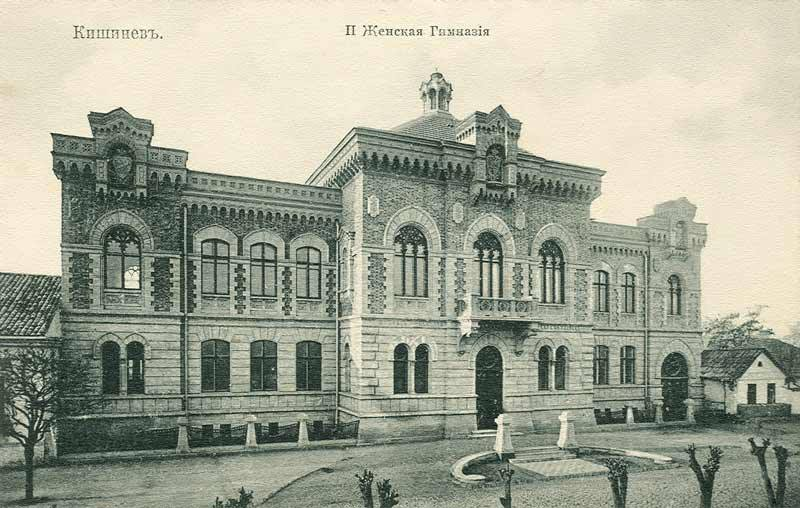
National Museum of Fine Arts, Chișinău

In the mid-1880s he designed: (Note: This section is based on the article on Bernardazzi in Encyclopedia of Odessa)

- The former Odessa railway station, 1879–1883, destroyed by the Nazis in 1944;
- Disability house (later converted to a factory, "Pischepromavtomatika" (Пищепромавтоматика)), Mechnikova 53 (Мечникова), 1886;
- The Odessa International Technical Society building, Baranova 1 (Баранова), in 1887.

Bernardazzi designed a large number of residential buildings and mansions:

- Preobrazhenska 15 (Ukrainian: Преображенська) (1891);
- Pastera 34 (Ukrainian: Пастера) (1891);
- Gogolaya 23 (Ukrainian: Гоголя);
- Troitska 20 (Ukrainian: Троїцька);
- Bazarna 20 (Ukrainian: Базарна) (1893);
- Deribasivska 31 (Ukrainian: Дерібасівська), tobacco shop (1894);
- Didrihsona, 7 (Ukrainian: Дідрихсона), mansion (1894).

By the 100th Anniversary of Odessa, Odessa city architect Bernardazzi led the work of the Technical Division of the Architectural Society and instructed the design and construction of a number of public buildings. Bernardazzi most memorable designs were in the 1890s:

- Medical school clinic at Pastera 7 (Пастера);
- Belinsky 9 hospital (Белинского) (1892);
- Warehouse building near the railway station (1890s);
- Reformed Church Pastera 62 (Пастера), the Puppet Theatre in Soviet period;
- Bristol Hotel at Pushkinskaya 15, 1898–1899;
- The New Stock Exchange, now the Odessa Philharmonic Theater (1894-1899).

Bernardazzi is also responsible for Baranova 18 (Баранова) (1902) and Troitska 18 (Ukrainian: Троїцька) (1903).

His other work includes:

- Porto-Franko Bank at Pushkinska 10 (Ukrainian: Пушкинська)
- A monument to Alexander II in Alexander Park. The statue was replaced and today only the base remains, used to honor Taras Shevchenko (Alexander Park has been renamed Shevchenko Park).
- St. Teodora de la Sihla Church
- Chişinău City Hall

== See also ==
- List of Russian architects
