= Odesa Philharmonic Theater =

Theatre in Odesa, Ukraine

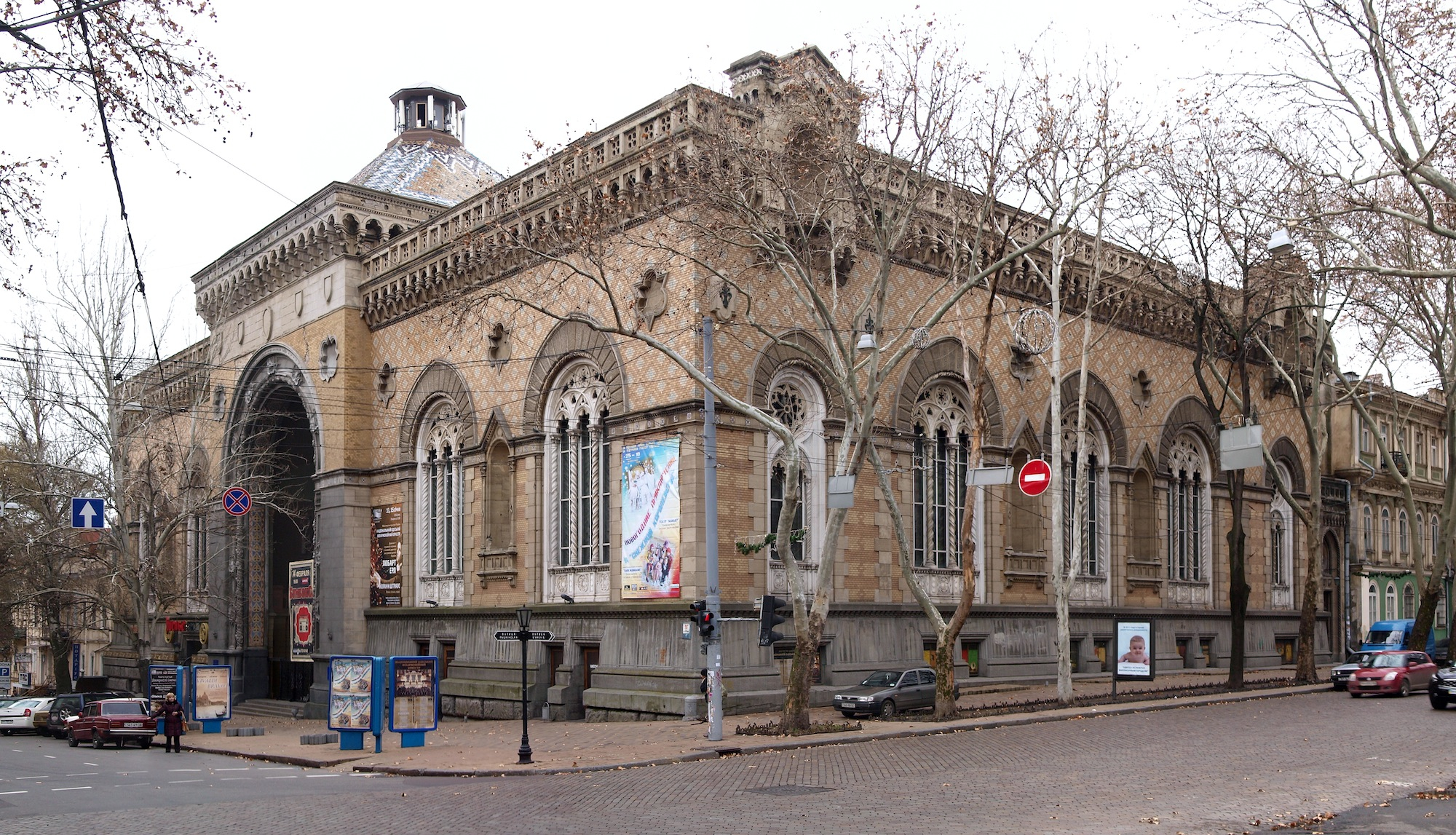
- Interactive map of Odesa Philharmonic Theater
- Former names: New Exchange
- Address: 17 Italiiska Street; Odesa; Ukraine
- Coordinates: 46°28′49″N 30°44′35″E
- Capacity: 1,000
- Type: Theater

Construction
- Groundbreaking: 3 September 1894
- Opened: 1898
- Architect: Alexander Bernardazzi

Tenant
- Odesa Philharmonic Theatre

Website
- odessaphil.org

The Odesa Philharmonic Theatre (Ukrainian: Одеська обласна філармонія, romanized: Odeska oblasna filarmonia) is a theater in Odesa, Ukraine. The design resembles the Doge's Palace in Venice.

== History ==
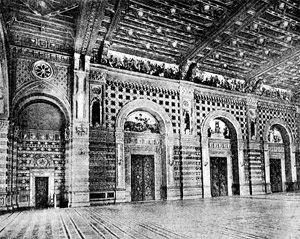
First photo of the Theater (7 February 1899)

The foundation stone for the theater was laid 3 September 1894, a day after the centennial of the founding of Odesa. The building was intended as the new stock exchange, or "New Exchange" to replace the old stock exchange, and the vast hall was decorated with six panels by the artist Nikolay Karazin (1842-1908) which depict commerce throughout various stages of history.

Like the Odesa Opera Theater before it, a world competition was announced for a conceptual design of a new Odesa stock exchange. The design of Czech architect V.J. Prohaska was considered the best. But this design did not meet all of the requirements, therefore it was modified and improved by Alexander Bernardazzi.

Construction was completed in 1898. Since 1924, the building has housed the Odesa Philharmonic.

The theatre was damaged in a Russian missile attack during the Russian invasion of Ukraine on 31 January 2025.

== Construction ==
The theater can seat 1,000 people and is 15 meters high and 910 square meters. The large hall has no supporting columns, and because of this, it was one of the most expensive buildings in Odesa to build.

The main entrance is by a large open-sided, roofed gallery, called a loggia. The ceiling of this open entry is painted with the twelve symbols of the Zodiac.

The interior is paneled with dark Lebanese cedar, and the windows are set in white Carrara marble.

== Pictures ==
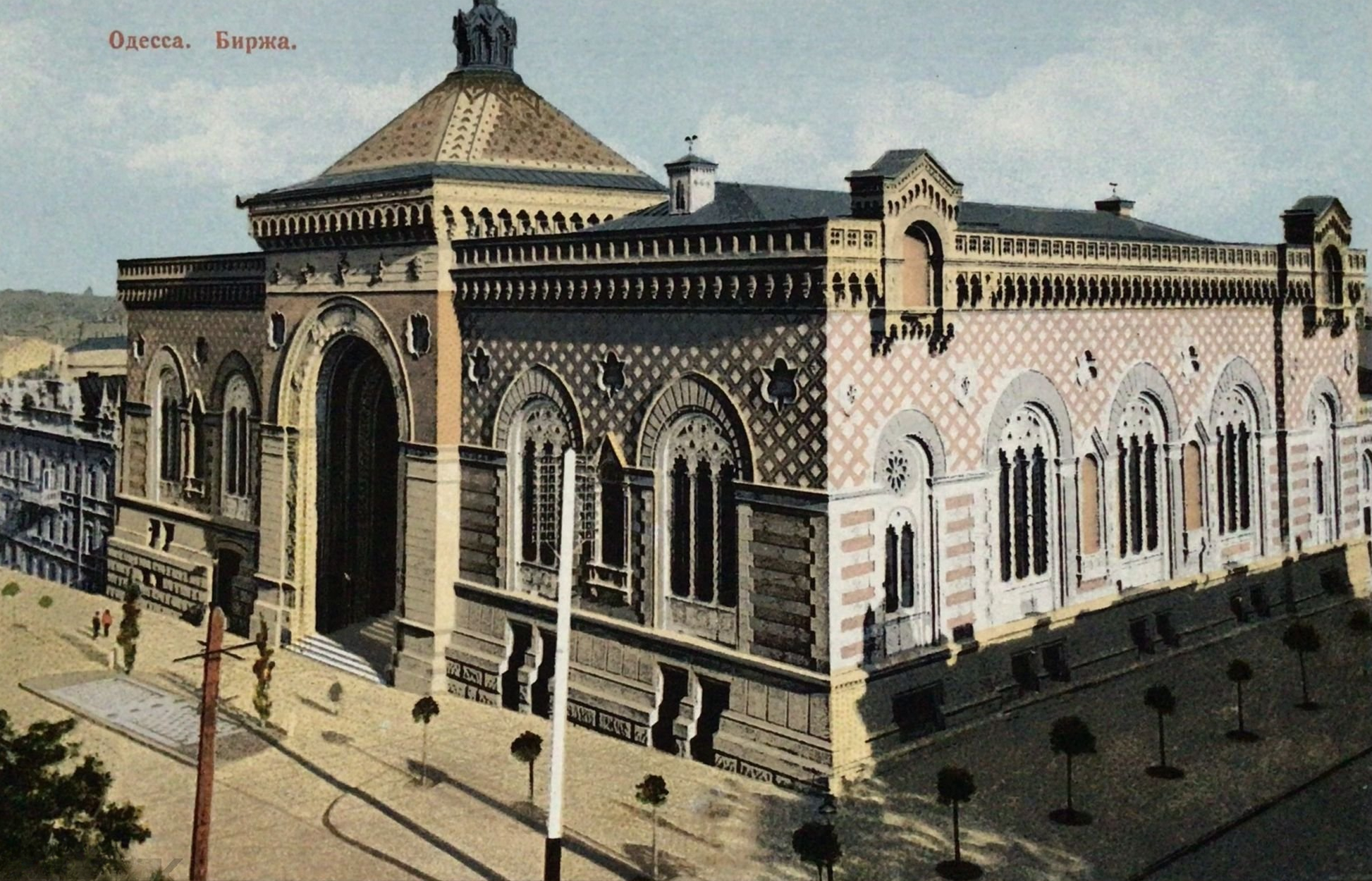
The building of the New Merchant Exchange in 1900

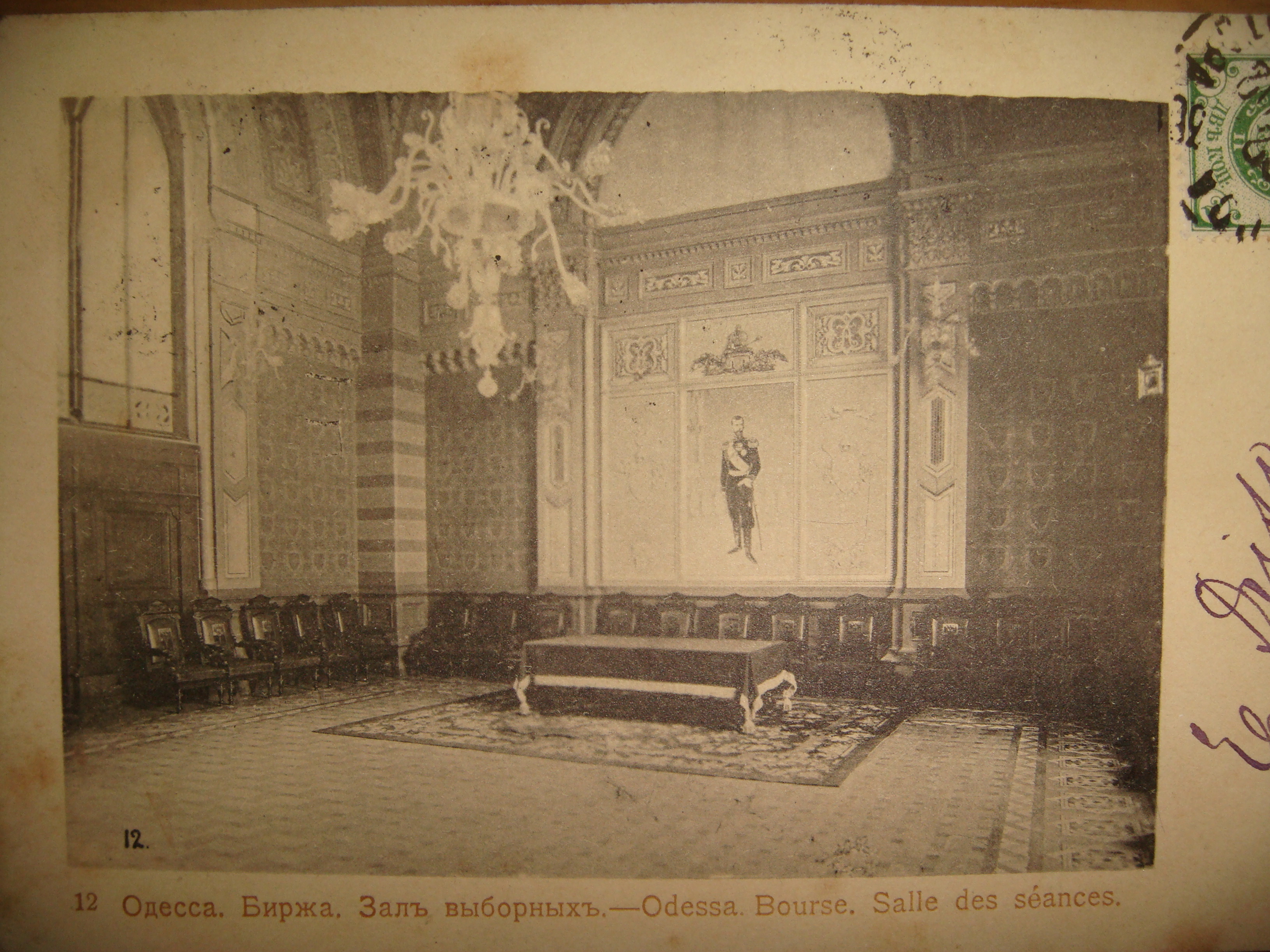
View of the interior decoration of one of the halls of the New Merchant Exchange. Postcard from the beginning of the 20th century

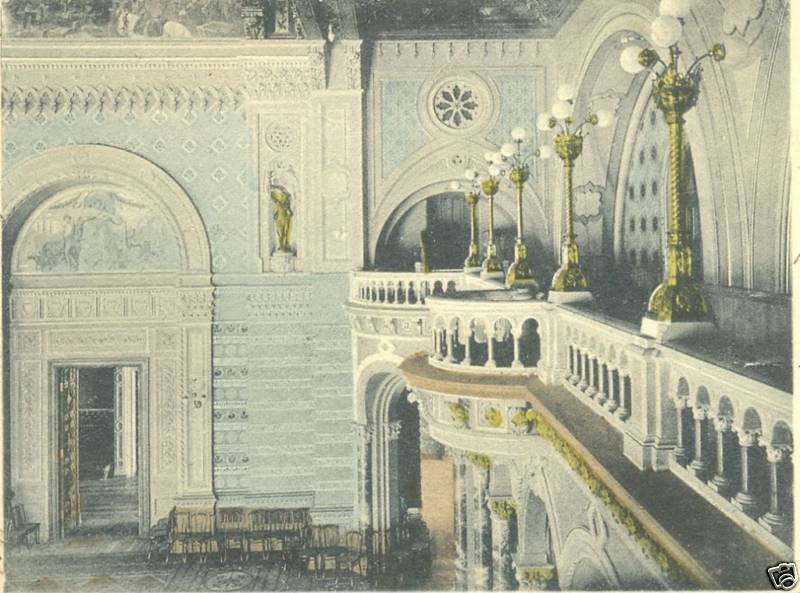
View of the interior decoration of the main hall of the New Merchant Exchange. Postcard from the beginning of the 20th century

== Odesa Philharmonic Orchestra ==
The theater serves as home for the Odesa Philharmonic Orchestra, which was founded in 1937. Since 1991, American Hobart Earle has conducted the orchestra.

== Mythology ==
It is an enduring myth that everyone in the city knows (and continues to promulgate) that since the building was originally designed as a Stock exchange rather than a concert hall it was made to be sound-resistant, rather than sound-conducting, in order to provide more privacy to visitors. Seems the myth created by Soviet singer Leonid Utyosov. In his memories, Utyosov half-jokingly described the building's appearance. This supposedly explains why the acoustics are rather poor, as compared with other theaters and concert halls, and performers must use microphones and amplifiers to be heard adequately. The precise and technical reasons for the acoustic problems at the hall were reported by world famous acoustics consultant Russell Johnson, the specifics of which can be found on the Philharmonic's website (https://web.archive.org/web/20180530074859/http://www.odessaphilharmonic.org/pages.php?page=conc)

== Quotes ==
...a handsome building of oriental architecture [it] is a center of activity. The trading takes place in a splendid hall on lines similar to those of the board of trade at Chicago.
