= Arctic and Antarctic Museum =

Museum in St. Petersburg, Russia

Russian State Museum of the Arctic and Antarctic
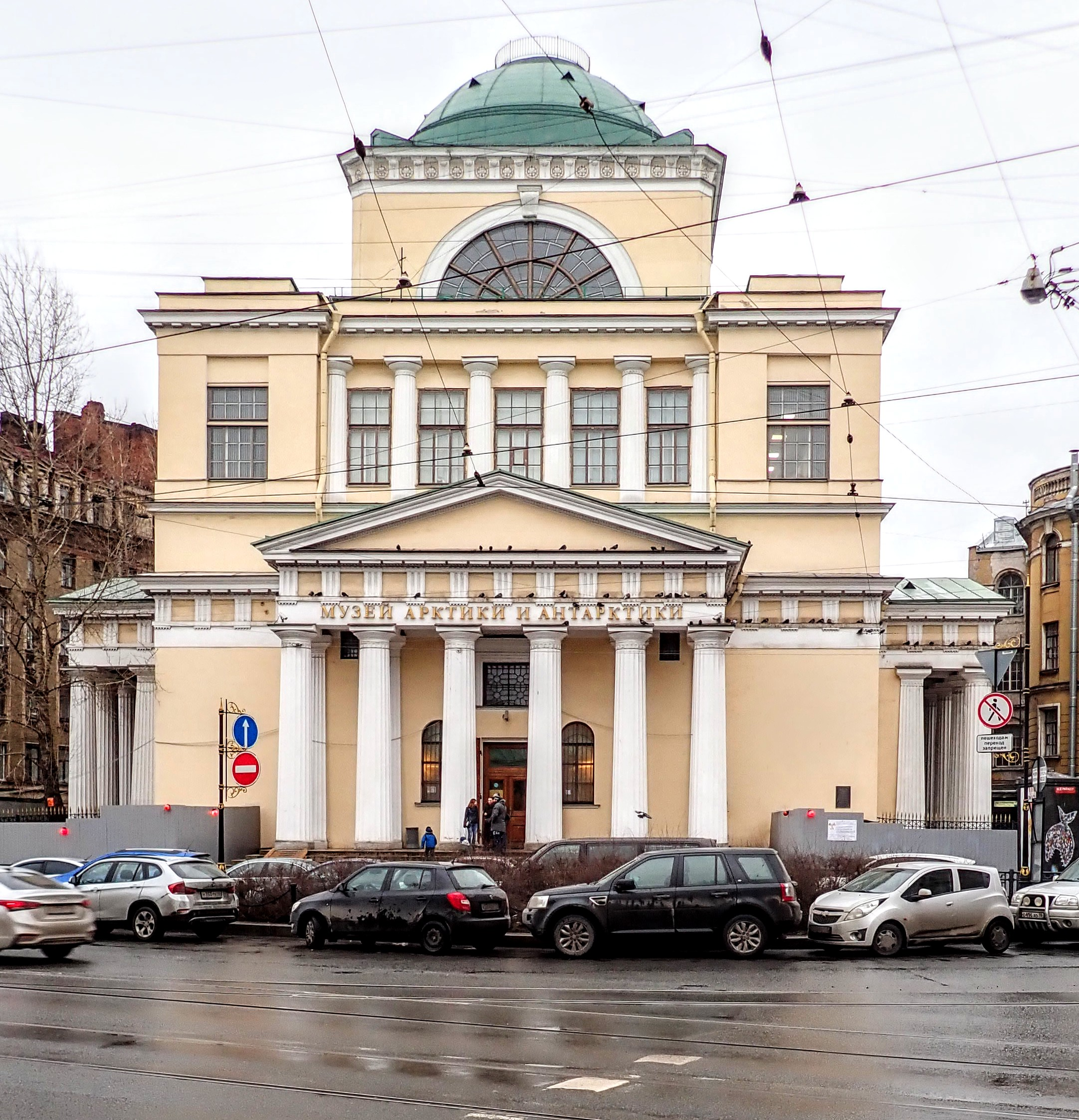
- Established: 1930
- Location: Saint Petersburg
- Coordinates: 59°55′39.02″N 30°21′12.94″E
- Director: Maria Vasilyevna Dukalskaya
- Website: www.polarmuseum.ru

The Russian State Arctic and Antarctic Museum (Russian: Российский государственный музей Арктики и Антарктики) is a museum in St. Petersburg, Russia dedicated to the historical aspects of scientific research in the Arctic and Antarctica, as well as the adjacent Soviet and Russian territories and the Northern Sea Route. It was established in November 1930 as part of the Soviet Arctic and Antarctic Research Institute, but was not opened until six years later. Since 1998, it has been under the administration of the Federal Service for Hydrometeorology and Environmental Monitoring.

The museum is housed in the building of the former Nikolskaya Old Believers' Church, constructed between 1820 and 1838 by architect Avraam Melnikov (closed in 1931).

== History ==
The establishment of the museum was preceded by extensive scientific research of the Arctic made by Soviet scientists, which began after the founding of the Northern Scientific-Commercial Expedition (Sevexpedition) in 1920, transformed in 1925 into the Institute for the Study of the North — now the Arctic and Antarctic Research Institute. In addition to conducting research, the institute carried out educational work, informing the USSR population about achievements in the exploration and study of the Arctic, including through temporary exhibitions in various cities.

It was founded on November 22, 1930, initially as a department of the All-Union Arctic Institute, into which the Institute for the Study of the North had been transformed. At first, the museum lacked a permanent exhibition and its own building, with its collection stored in the basements of the Fountain House, where the institute was located, and used solely for temporary exhibitions. In 1933, the Leningrad City Council leased the building of the Nikolskaya Old Believers' Church, closed two years earlier, on Marata Street to the institute for the museum's use. The museum gained its own premises and, over the period from 1934 to 1936, prepared a permanent exhibition. During this time, under the supervision of architect Alexander Sivkov, the former church building was renovated to meet the museum's needs. The development of the museum's scientific concept and exhibition involved Arctic scientists and researchers, including Otto Schmidt, Yuly Shokalsky, and leading researchers of the All-Union Arctic Institute—Sergey Obruchev, Vladimir Vize, Vsevolod Beryozkin, Alexey Laktionov, Leonid Balakshin, and Mikhail Yermolaev. On January 8, 1937, the museum opened to visitors. Its first director was the artist and polar explorer Nikolay Pinegin.

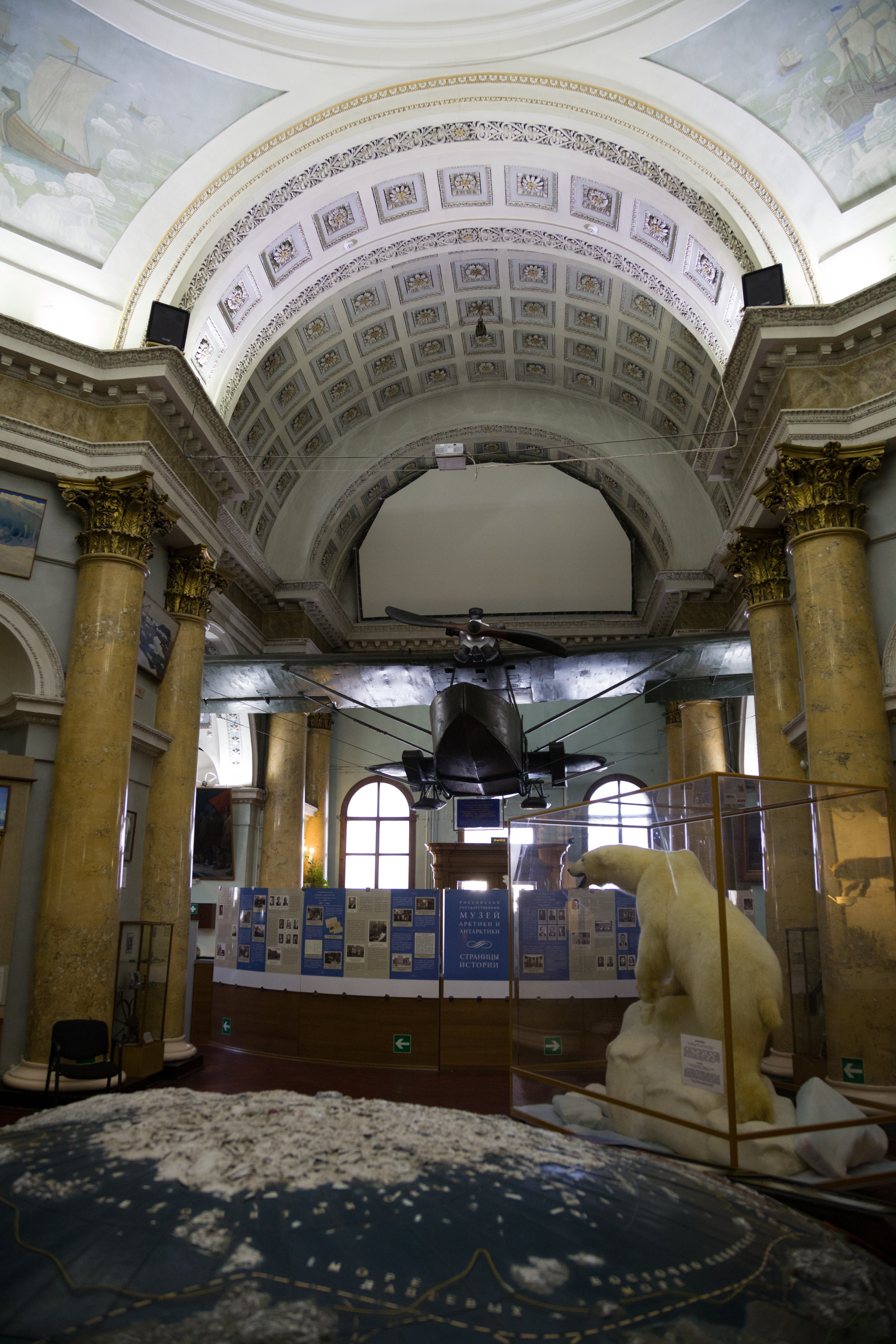
Museum interior

The museum's creation coincided with a surge of interest in the Arctic region in the USSR and successes in its exploration: the icebreaker Alexander Sibiryakov's passage through the entire Northern Sea Route in a single navigation season in 1932, the rescue of the Chelyuskin expedition in 1933, the trans-Arctic flight led by Valery Chkalov in 1937, and the expedition of the world's first drift ice station, North Pole-1, in 1937–1938. These events significantly expanded the museum's scientific and exhibition base. Notably, in 1936, the museum acquired the Sh-2 amphibious aircraft, which was aboard the Chelyuskin, listed as item number 1 in the museum's acquisition book. In 1938, the museum received the tent and personal belongings of the North Pole-1 expedition members. Soviet polar expeditions were encouraged to donate items to the Arctic Museum upon their return. The museum's initial exhibition included three sections: "Natural Productive Forces of the Arctic," "Economic Development of the Arctic and the Northern Sea Route," and "National-Cultural Development of the Arctic." By the early 1940s, the museum's collections numbered around 10,000 items, and in early 1941, it held a traveling exhibition, "Soviet Arctic," displayed in Novgorod, Borovichy, and Kalinin.

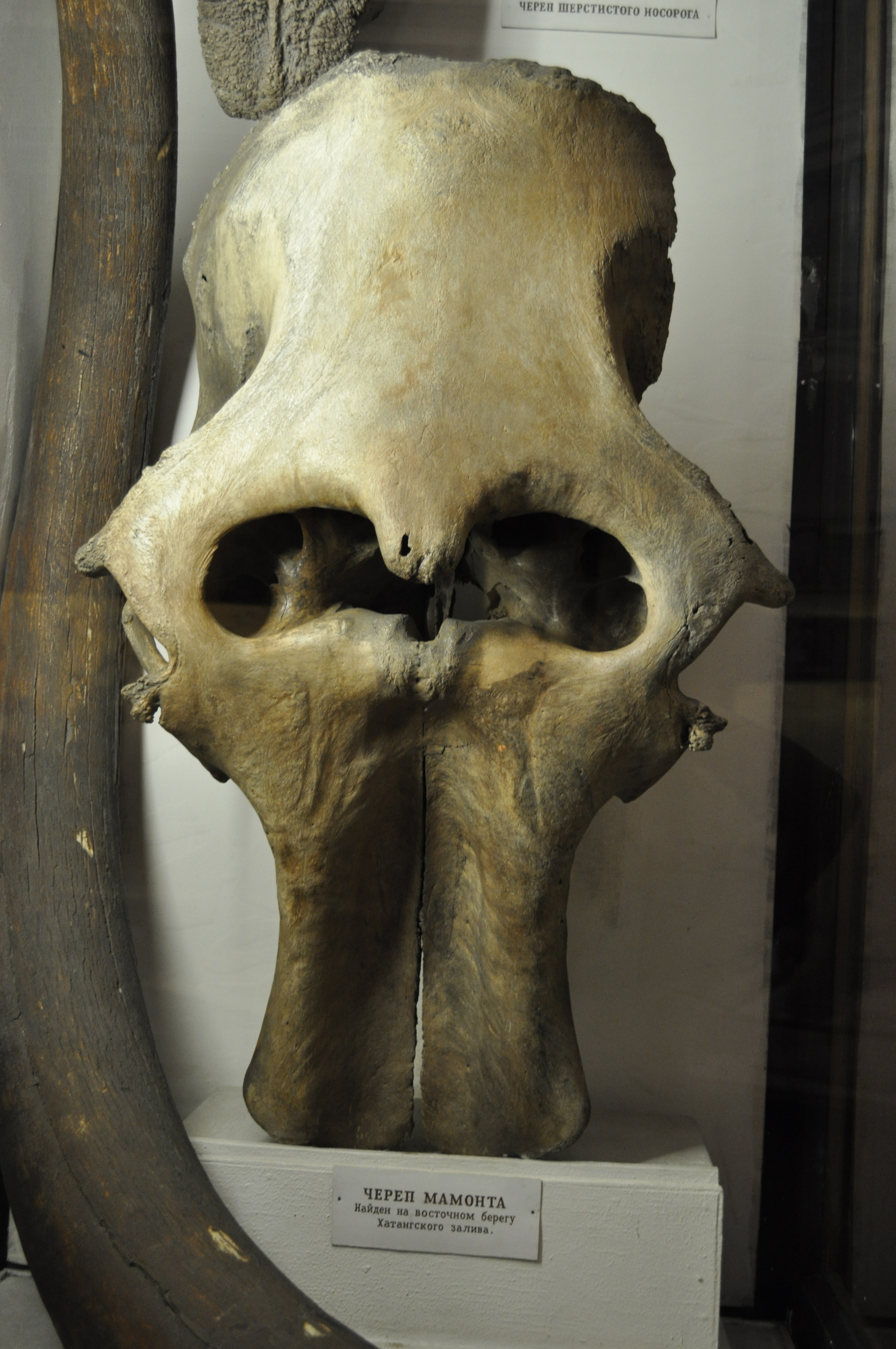
Mammoth skull. Found on the eastern shore of Khatanga Bay

After the start of the Great Patriotic War, the museum was mothballed by September 1, 1941, and part of its collection, including the most valuable items, was evacuated to Krasnoyarsk, where the Arctic Institute had been relocated. The artifacts were temporarily housed in the Krasnoyarsk Regional Museum, where they were used for exhibitions, the largest of which was "Conquered Arctic." In 1944, the evacuated artifacts returned to Leningrad. On February 10, 1946, a temporary exhibition opened. At the same time, a major renovation of the museum building began, lasting three years. During the renovation, a new scientific concept for the museum was developed, incorporating new Arctic data and recent additions to the museum's collections. As in the 1930s, Arctic Institute staff contributed to this concept. Leningrad artists Lev Bogomolets, Mikhail Platunov, Mikhail Uspensky, and Ivan Tsepalin participated in the museum's artistic design. On March 12, 1950, the permanent exhibition opened.

In the 1950s, Soviet researchers intensively explored Antarctica, and the museum's scope expanded accordingly. Its collection grew with items from Antarctic expeditions, and a dedicated Antarctic section was created. In July 1958, the museum was renamed the Museum of the Arctic and Antarctic.

In subsequent decades, the museum's collection continued to grow through contributions from the institute. Many items were donated by polar explorers, pilots, ship captains, photographers, artists, and journalists. The collection increasingly included artifacts related to the earlier exploration of the Far North, such as finds from archaeological excavations of the city of Mangazeya.

On February 2, 1998, the museum was granted the status of the "Russian State Museum of the Arctic and Antarctic". It was removed from the jurisdiction of the Arctic and Antarctic Research Institute and placed under the Federal Service for Hydrometeorology and Environmental Monitoring (Rosgidromet). At that time, the museum was headed by Russian polar explorer and traveler Viktor Boyarsky, who served as director until 2016.

== Collections and Exhibition ==
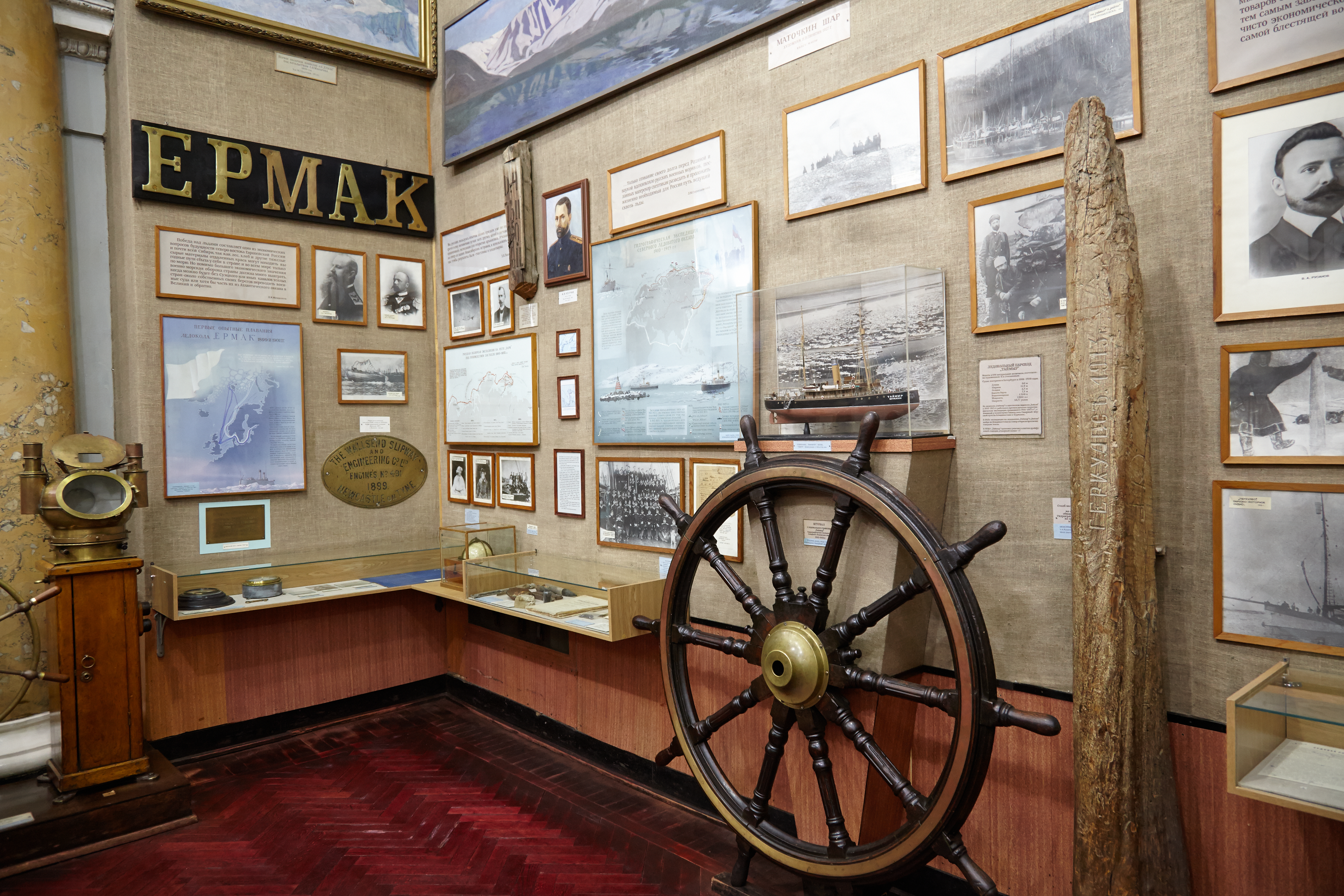
Ship's wheel and model of the icebreaker Taymyr

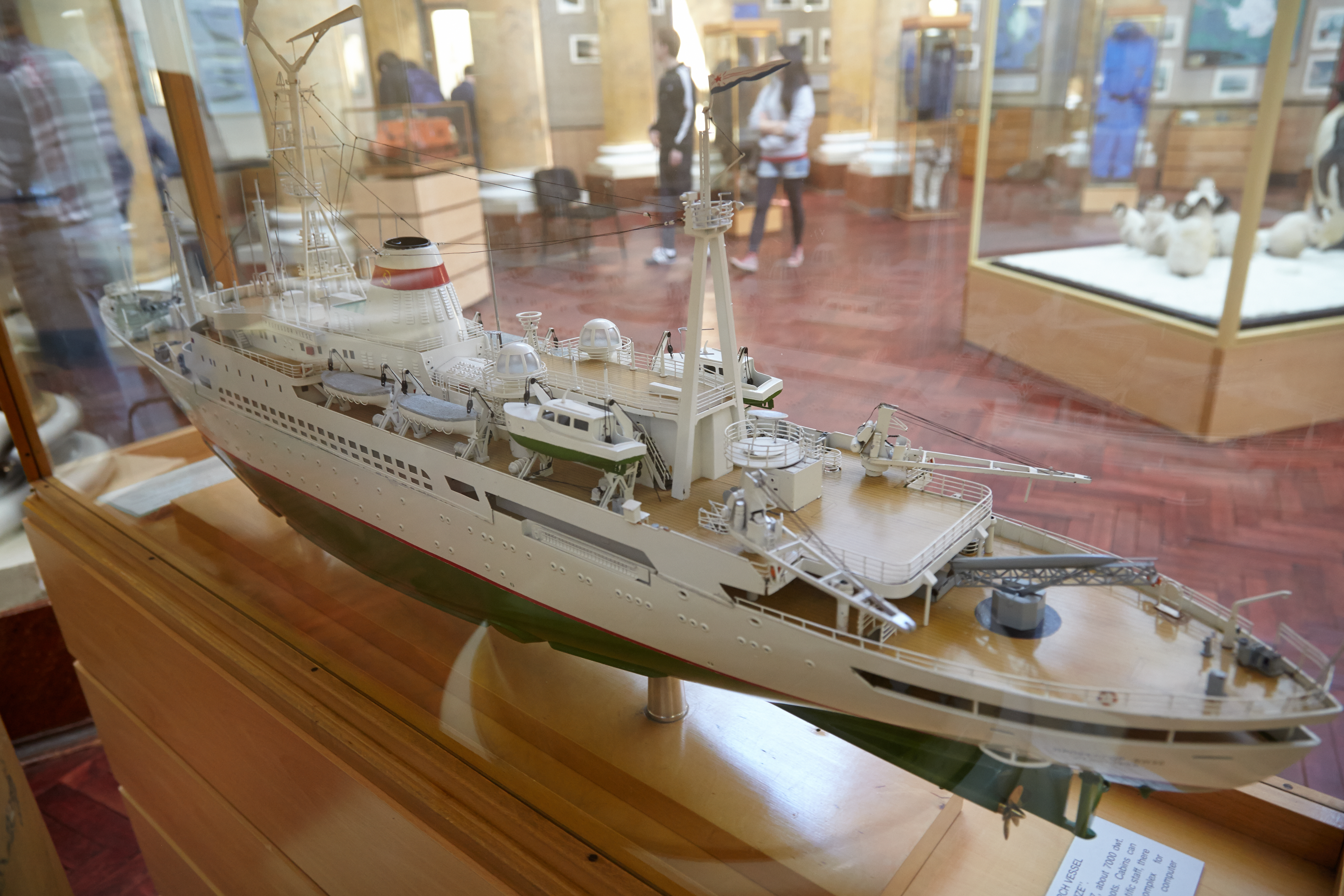
Model of the research vessel Professor Vize, on which writer Vladimir Sanin traveled to the shores of Antarctica

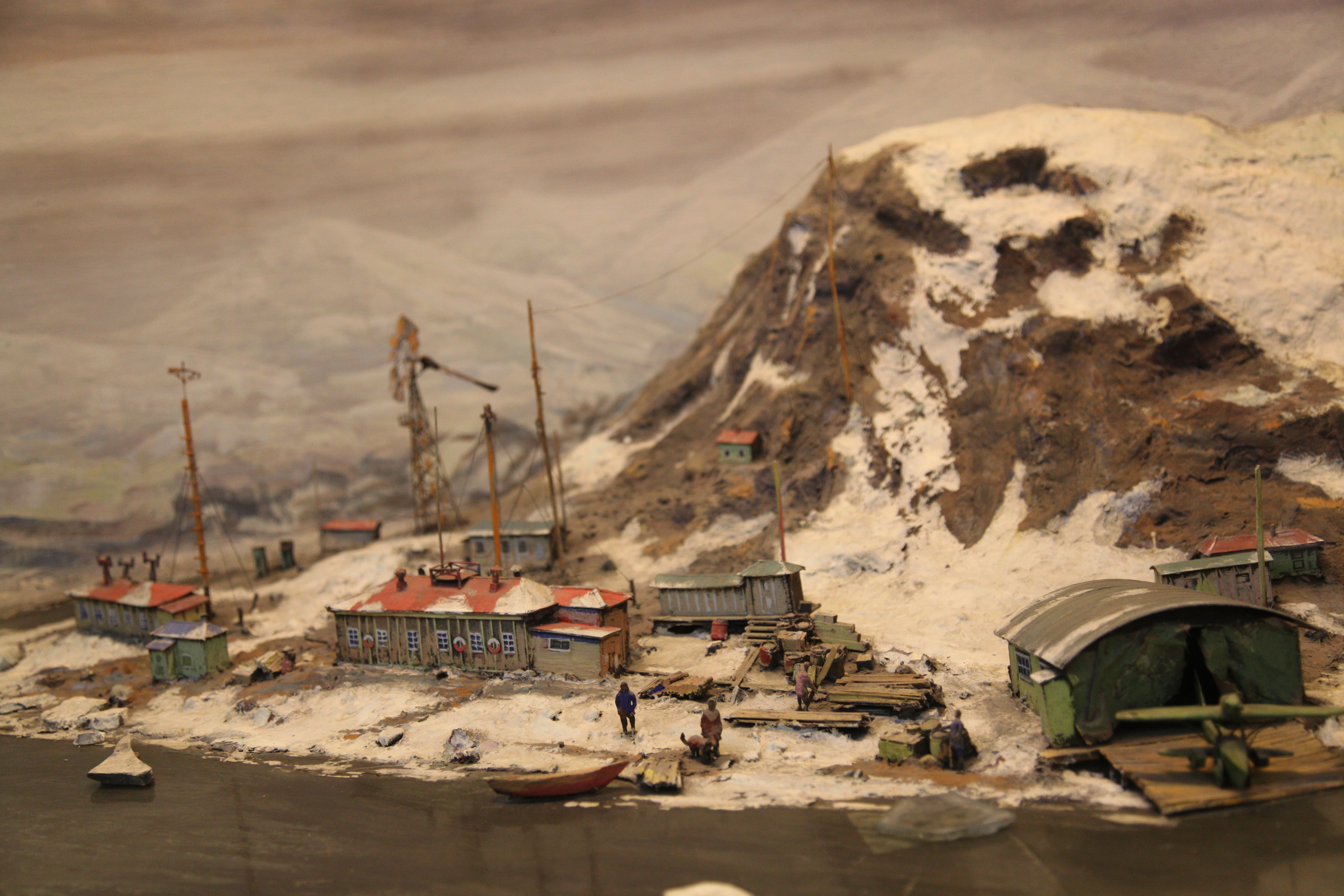
Model of a northern polar station

The Arctic and Antarctic Museum is currently the largest museum in the world dedicated to polar themes. Its collections comprise approximately 70,000 items, including authentic artifacts, photographs (about 34,000), and works of art. The most notable collections include an archaeological collection of household items of the Pomors from the first half of the 17th century, found on the Taymyr Peninsula, a collection of decorative and applied arts of the peoples of the North, a collection of fine art by students of the Institute of the Peoples of the North from the 1930s, and a set of equipment and gear from the North Pole-1 drift station. The museum's permanent exhibition includes 20,000 items, divided into three sections: "Nature of the Arctic," "History of Exploration and Development of the Northern Sea Route," and "Antarctica".

The "Nature of the Arctic" section highlights the physical and geographical features of the Arctic, its fauna, and flora. Its centerpiece is the "Arctic" model — a segment of a globe with a relief map of the Arctic up to the 60th parallel north, created in 1936 based on cartographic materials by Yuly Shokalsky. During the same period, the dioramas "Tundra in Winter," "Tundra in Summer," "Bird Bazaar," "Walrus Rookery," "Shokalsky Glacier on Novaya Zemlya," and "Matochkin Shar Strait" were created and displayed in this section.

The "History of Exploration and Development of the Northern Sea Route" section is dedicated to the history of Arctic exploration from the Middle Ages to the present day. It opens with a fragment of a Pomor koch and reconstructed clothing of seafarers from the 15th to 16th centuries. The exhibition includes personal belongings of participants in Arctic expeditions from the 16th to 18th centuries found by researchers in various locations, notably wooden utensils from the equipment of the Lena-Yenisei detachment of the Great Northern Expedition in the 1730s. Special attention is given to Soviet polar expeditions of the 1930s, with their personal items, instruments used in expeditions, and photographs on display. The most prominent exhibits in this section are the ship's wheel of the world's first Arctic icebreaker Yermak and the authentic Sh-2 amphibious aircraft used in the Chelyuskin expedition in 1933—the first item acquired by the museum and considered its "calling card." The section concludes with an artistic model of the "Polar Aurora".

The third section of the exhibition, "Antarctica," is dedicated to Antarctica, its discovery, research, and nature. Since the history of Antarctic exploration, which began in the 19th century, is much shorter than that of the Arctic, it was decided not to divide the Antarctic section into separate parts—nature and research are presented in a single exhibition hall located on the museum's second floor, under a light drum with a dome. Notably, the center of the hall features a diorama with stuffed penguins, while artifacts and documents from Antarctic expeditions are displayed around the perimeter. Flags of the states that signed the Antarctic Treaty in 1959 are hung under the dome.

Additionally, the museum extensively features paintings on polar (primarily Arctic) themes. These include works by Nikolay Pinegin, Alexander Borisov, Ivan Shultse, Ivan Meshalkin, Mikhail Platunov, Nikolay Bublikov, Mikhail Uspensky, and Alexander Benois. Among recent acquisitions are drawings by the late 19th-century Russian polar explorer Evstafy Tyagin and contemporary Russian traveler Fyodor Konyukhov.

According to former museum director Viktor Boyarsky, the Arctic and Antarctic Museum deliberately maintains an archaic exhibition style, first to avoid dissonance between modern digital equipment and the neoclassical interiors of the building, and second to preserve the atmosphere of a Soviet museum.

The position of museum director is currently held by Maria Dukalskaya, who succeeded Viktor Boyarsky in 2016. Boyarsky claimed he was dismissed due to a conflict with Rosgidromet.

== Researches and exhibition activities ==
The museum conducts scientific research on polar regions of the Earth and promotes knowledge about them. It also participates in scientific conferences related to its themes, for example, in 2018, it took part in the Third International Scientific Conference "Arctic: History and Modernity".

For visitors, the museum offers guided tours and educational programs. Since 2009, it has annually participated in Museum Night, and in 2019, it was among the ten most visited venues.

In addition to its permanent exhibition, the museum regularly hosts temporary exhibitions. A significant portion of these focus on painting and decorative and applied arts. For example, from 2012 to 2017, the museum held the exhibition "Uelen Bone: Art of Chukchi Masters," showcasing works by masters of the Uelen Bone Carving Workshop. In 2015 and 2016, it hosted the exhibitions "How Beautiful Is My Land, Take a Look…," dedicated to the culture and art of the peoples of the Far North, and "Colors of White Horizons," displaying drawings by travelers and polar expedition participants.

Some thematic exhibitions are timed to anniversary dates. For example, in 2015, the museum opened the exhibition "To the 100th Anniversary of the Completion of the Hydrographic Expedition of the Arctic Ocean", and in 2016–2017, the exhibition "To the 60th Anniversary of the Start of Domestic Scientific Research in Antarctica". In 2019, the exhibition "Northern Sea Route in the Era of the Nuclear Fleet" was opened, dedicated to the 60th anniversary of the nuclear icebreaker Lenin; the museum presented eight models of Soviet and Russian nuclear icebreakers.

Some exhibitions focus on specific details related to polar themes: for example, the 2019 exhibition "Four-Legged Fighters of the Arctic" highlighted animals (dogs, reindeer, horses) in the Arctic during the Great Patriotic War, using materials from the collections of the Murmansk Regional Museum The museum also hosts photography exhibitions. For example, in 2018, it held a photo exhibition about Nenets reindeer herders titled "Real People". Also in 2018, in collaboration with the Murmansk Regional Museum, the exhibition "Murmansk – Gateway to the Arctic" was held, dedicated to the history of Murmansk and its role in the exploration of the North.

== Conflict with the Russian Orthodox Church over the Museum Building ==
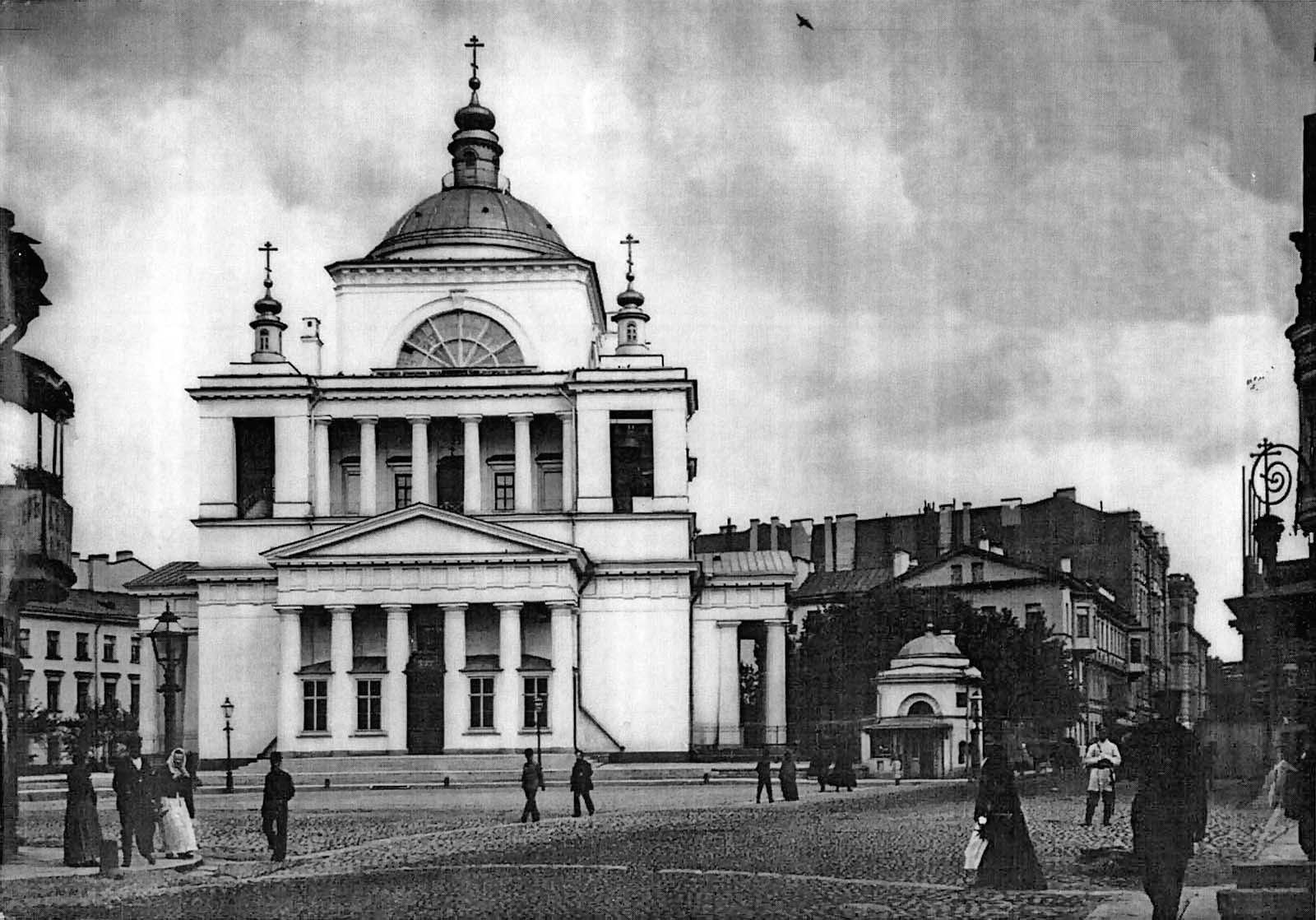
Nikolskaya Old Believers' Church in the 19th century

Since 1991, the Saint Petersburg Edinoverie community of the Russian Orthodox Church has sought to reclaim the building of the former church, which would require the museum to relocate to a new site. This led to a conflict of interests between the community and the museum. However, only one of the two chapels (on the side of Kuznechny Lane) was returned to the faithful.

In 2013, the church submitted a request to reclaim the building, and in February 2014, it was approved by Rosimushchestvo based on a 2010 law on the restitution of church property seized during Soviet times. Plans were made for the museum's relocation, with potential new locations including buildings of the Rosgidromet department and the Arctic and Antarctic Research Institute. A proposal to move to Novo-Admiralteysky Island was also considered. Museum director Viktor Boyarsky insisted on keeping the museum at its current location, arguing that the proposed premises were too small and that transporting certain collection items, particularly dioramas, would be highly problematic, potentially damaging the collection. Ultimately, in the spring of 2014, the decision to transfer the building to the church was canceled because the community failed to submit a preservation obligation project to the Ministry of Culture of the Russian Federation, which was necessary since the building is a federally designated architectural monument. In 2015, the church submitted another request to return the building to the Edinoverie community, but it was rejected for the second time.

In 2019, a decision was made to restore the museum building.

== Development projects ==
In November 2023, the museum announced the launch of a competition to develop a project for the improvement of the adjacent territory. Plans include creating an Arctic garden near the museum building, establishing new relaxation areas, and setting up an interactive exhibition space.

== See also ==
- List of museums in Saint Petersburg

== Bibliography ==
- Brontman, L. K. (1938). On top of the world: the Soviet expedition to the North pole, 1937—1938.
- Sherih, Dmitry (2004). По улице Марата [Along Marata Street] (in Russian). Москва: ЗАО Центрполиграф. ISBN 978-5-9524-0907-1.
- Российский государственный музей Арктики и Антарктики [Russian State Museum of the Arctic and Antarctic] (in Russian). РГМАА. 2008.
- Dukalskaya, M. V. (2012). "Юбилей Российского государственного музея Арктики и Антарктики" [Jubilee of the Russian State Museum of the Arctic and Antarctic]. Российские полярные исследования [Russian Polar Studies] (in Russian) (1 (7)): 42–43.
- Boyarsky, V. I. (2016). "Российский государственный музей Арктики и Антарктики «Славное прошлое, тревожное настоящее и светлое будущее…»" [Russian State Museum of the Arctic and Antarctic "Glorious Past, Troubled Present, and Bright Future…"]. Морская радиоэлектроника [Marine Radioelectronics] (in Russian) (1 (55)): 54–55.
