= Vasily Khudyakov =

Russian painter (1825–1871)

- Василий Григорьевич Худяков
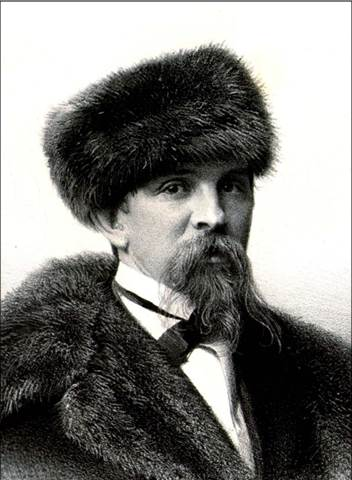
- Portrait lithograph by Vasily Timm, from the Russian Art Folio (1861)
- Born: January 5, 1826; Akshuat, Simbirsk Governorate
- Died: July 26, 1876 (aged 50); St. Petersburg
- Education: Member Academy of Arts (1851); Professor by rank (1860)
- Alma mater: Moscow School of Painting; Imperial Academy of Arts
- Known for: Painting

Vasily Grigorievich Khudyakov (Russian: Васи́лий Григо́рьевич Худяко́в; 5 January 1826 [O.S. 24 December 1825] — 26 July 1871 [O.S. 14]) was a Russian history, portrait and genre painter.

== Biography ==
He began his studies at the Stroganov Moscow State University of Arts and Industry, then spent almost two years at the Moscow School of Painting, Sculpture and Architecture (MSPSA). His mentor there was Professor Fyodor Zav'yalov, who invited him to be an assistant for decorative work that was being done in the entrance hall of Kremlin Palace. Some of his paintings were shown at the Imperial Academy of Arts, where they received a silver medal.

In 1848, he went to Saint Petersburg and audited classes at the Academy. In his rush to be named a "Free Artist", he accepted a silver medal and passed up the opportunity to compete for a gold one. After that, he mostly painted portraits on commission. In 1851, upon completing one of Dean Avraam Melnikov, he was named an "Academician".

Among other notable works at this time were "Finnish Smugglers", one of the first two works purchased by Pavel Tretyakov for his gallery, and "Persecution of Christians in the East", purchased by Tsar Nicholas I as a gift to King Otto of Greece.

In 1856, he visited France and Italy; staying in Paris, Rome and Naples for about four years while continuing to execute commissions for members of the Russian nobility. On the basis of these works, he was named a Professor by the Academy in 1860. After returning, he became a teacher at the MSPSA. In 1862, he moved to Saint Petersburg, where he continued to exhibit frequently. He died of cholera in 1871.

== Selected paintings ==
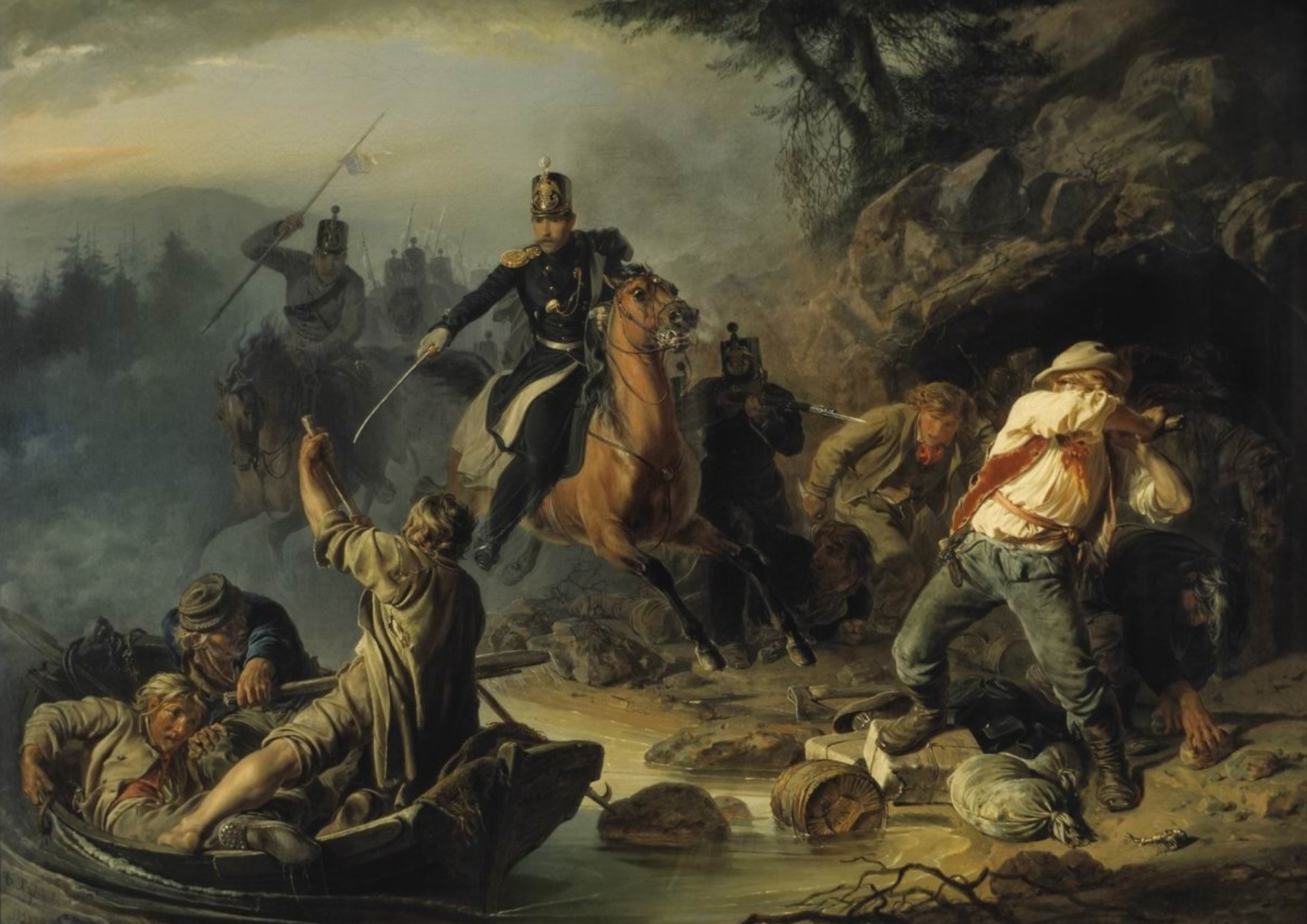
Finnish Smugglers

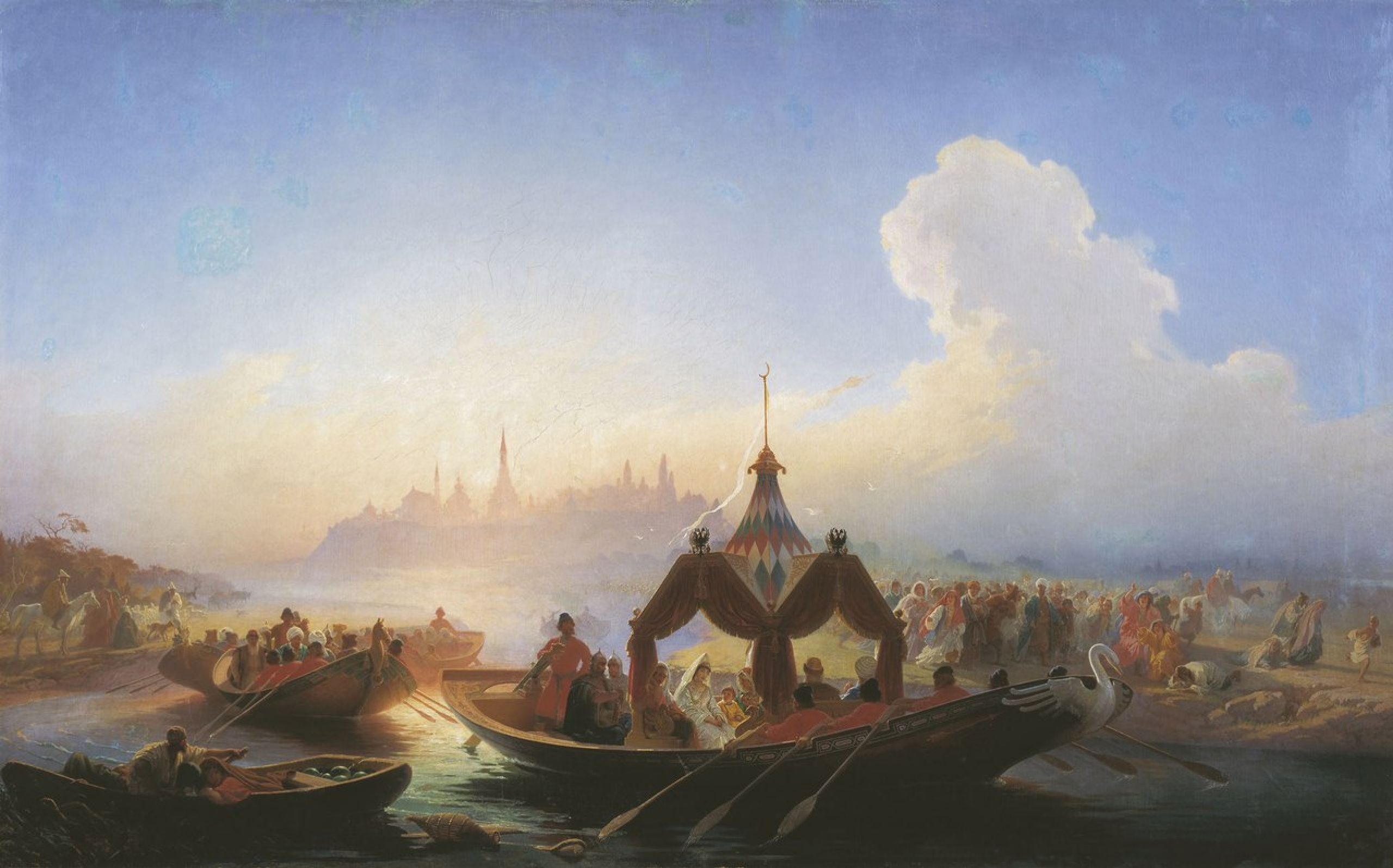
Captured Queen Syuyumbika leaving Kazan

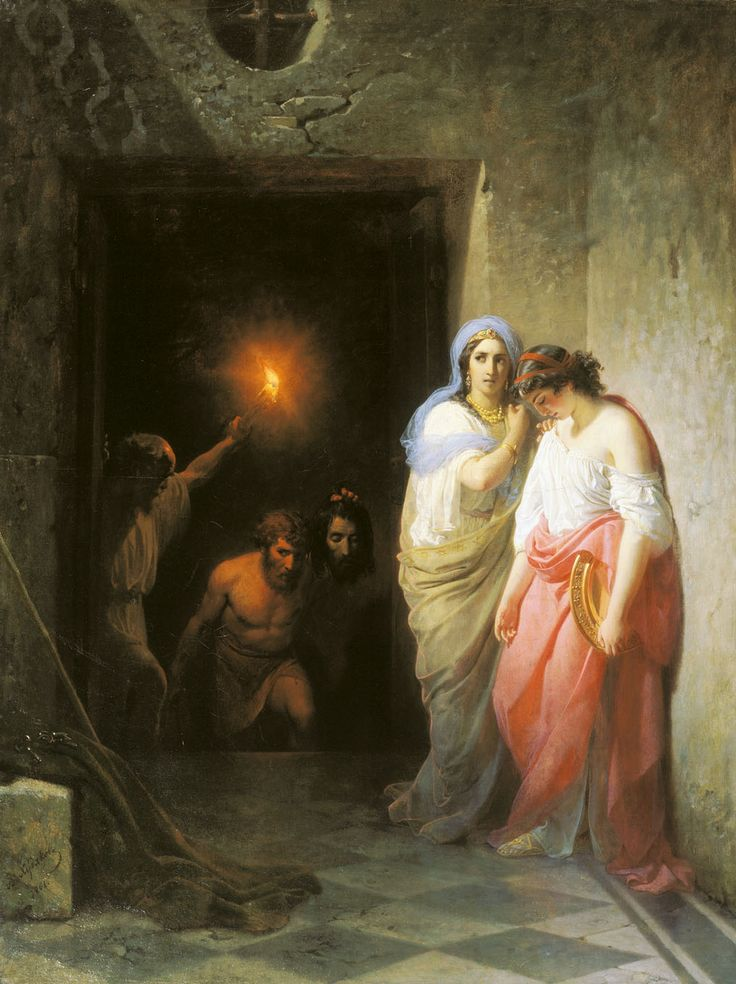
Herodias and her daughter before cutting off the head of John the Baptist
