= Nativity Cathedral, Chișinău =

Nativity of Christ Cathedral
- Catedrala Mitropolitană „Nașterea Domnului”
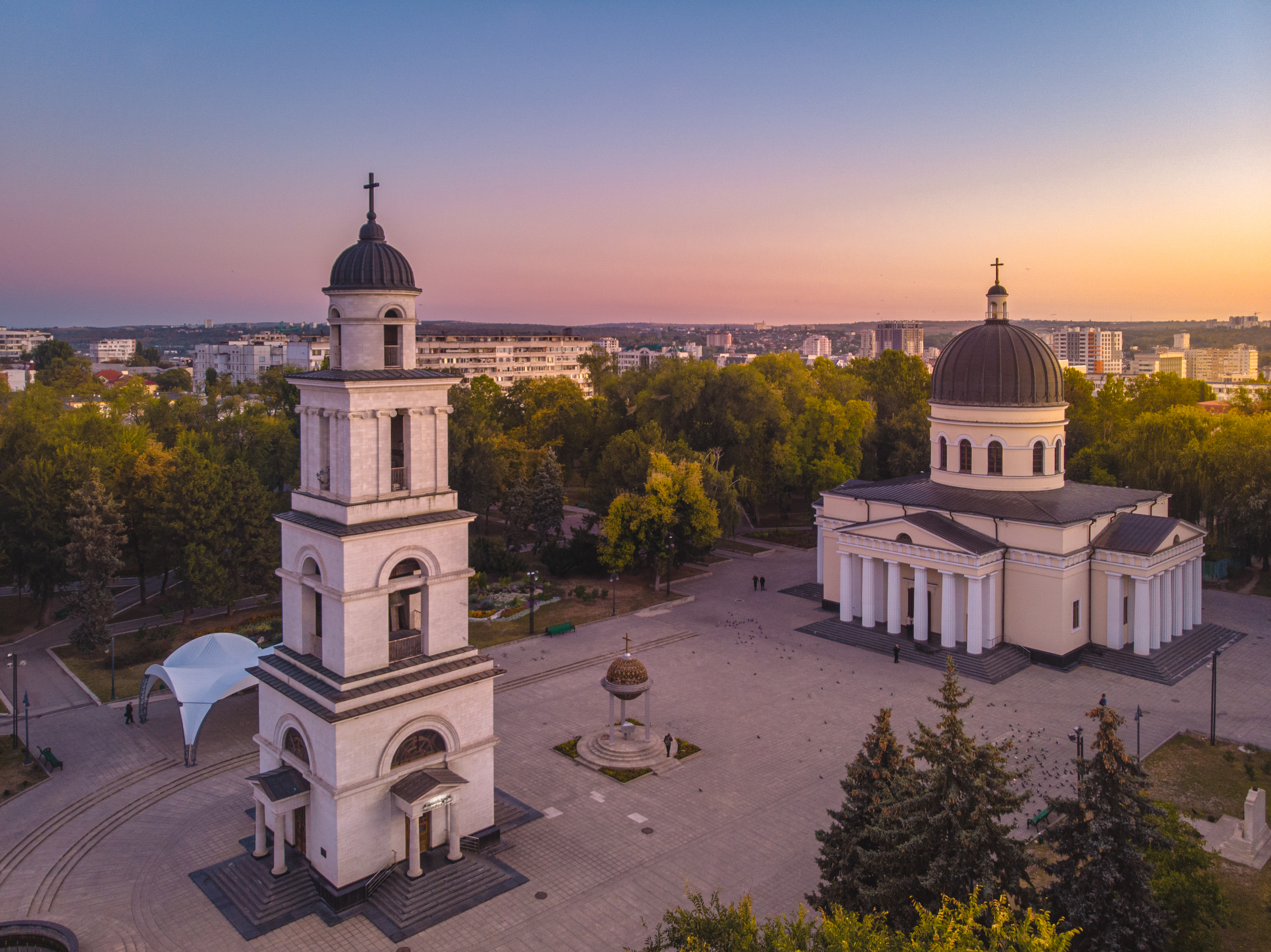
- Nativity of Christ Cathedral
- 47°01′33.8″N 28°50′04.3″E
- Location: Central Chișinău
- Country: Moldova
- Denomination: Eastern Orthodox

History
- Status: Cathedral
- Dedication: Jesus
- Dedicated: 15 October 1836

Architecture
- Architect: Abram Melnikov
- Style: Empire

Specifications
- Length: 37.44 m (122.8 ft)

The Cathedral of Christ's Nativity (Romanian: Catedrala Mitropolitană „Nașterea Domnului”) is the main cathedral of the Moldovan Orthodox Church in Sectorul Centru, Moldova. It was built in 1830 to a design by Abram Melnikov. The bell tower was destroyed in 1962, and the cathedral was transformed into an exhibition centre during the Soviet period, before returning to religious purposes. A new bell tower was constructed in 1997.

== History ==
It was commissioned by the governor of New Russia, Prince Mikhail Semyonovich Vorontsov, and Metropolitan Gavril Bănulescu-Bodoni in 1830. The cathedral was built in the 1830s to a Neoclassical design by Abram Melnikov (who had designed a similar church in Bolhrad). The cathedral was bombed during World War II, and its bell tower was destroyed by the local Communists in 1962. During the Soviet period, worship was prohibited and the cathedral was transformed into an exhibition center. Since that period, it has been returned to its religious purpose in 1989. Restoration work continued from then until 1996, and a new bell tower was constructed in 1997.

In 2016 the Bank of Moldova minted a commemorative coin to celebrate the 180th anniversary of the building of the cathedral. The silver coin had a face value of 50 lei, and featured the Coat of Arms of the Republic of Moldova on one side, with an image of the "Nativity" Cathedral from Chisinau on the other side.

== Design ==
Melnikov's design is Neoclassical. The façade is very simple and clear with six Doric columns marking the entrance. Because of the numerous attacks which the cathedral suffered throughout time, the building has received several restorations and shifts in its shape. For instance, the current zinc dome and its cross at the top are both an addition from 1997, built over the previous structure. The inside was completely blank during the Soviet period. Today the interior walls are again painted in pure Orthodox style.

== Gallery ==
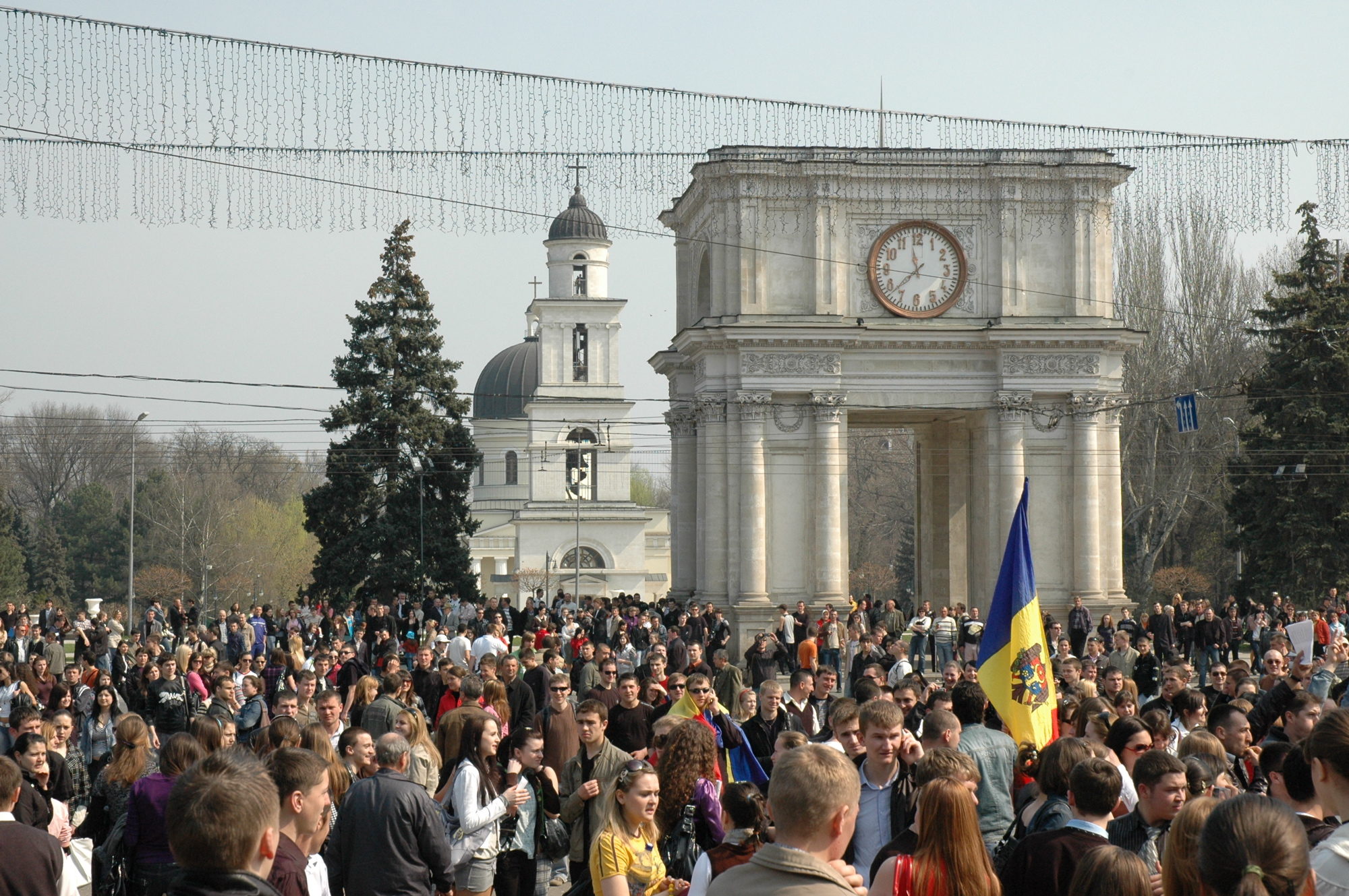
During 2009 parliamentary election protests

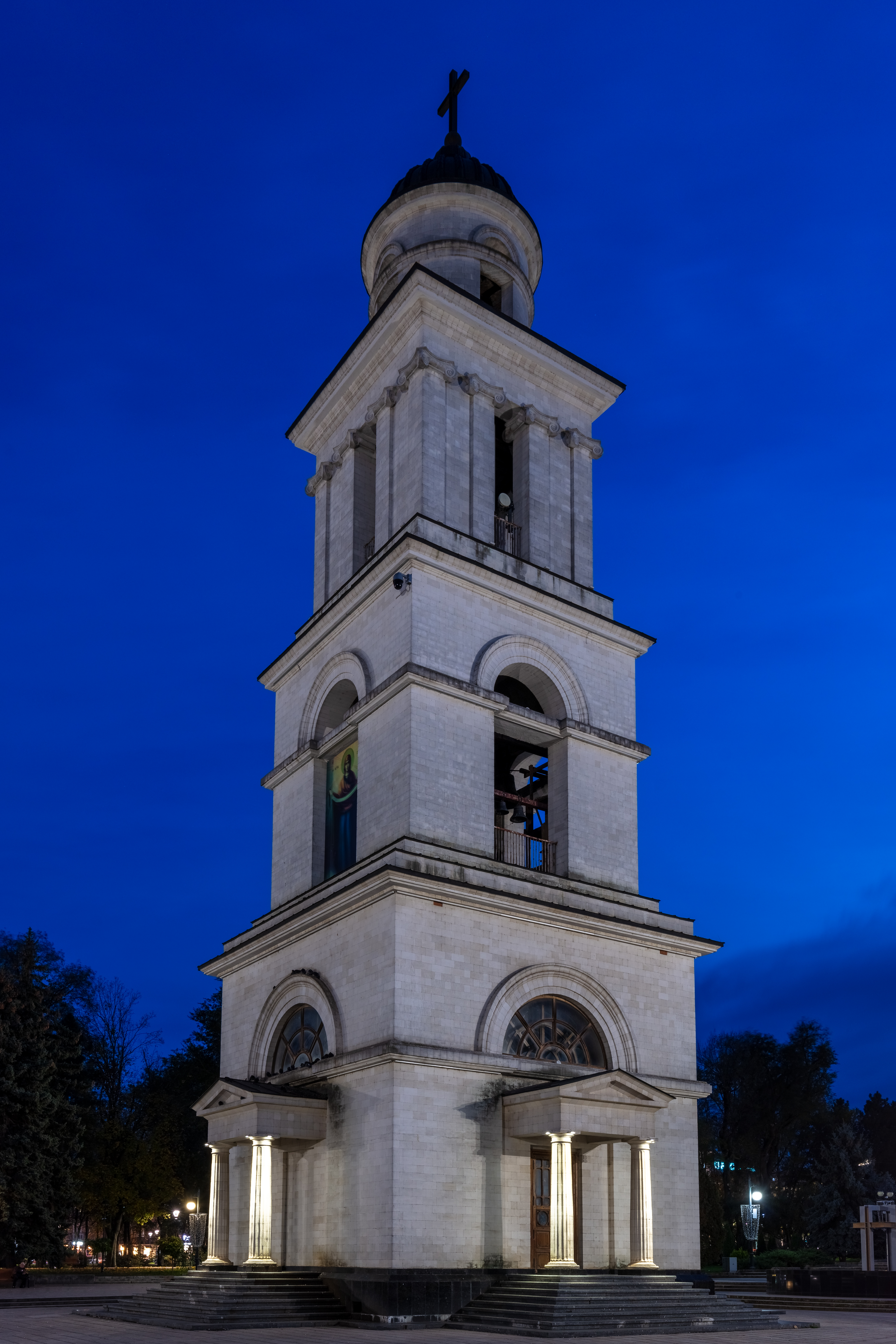
Belfry

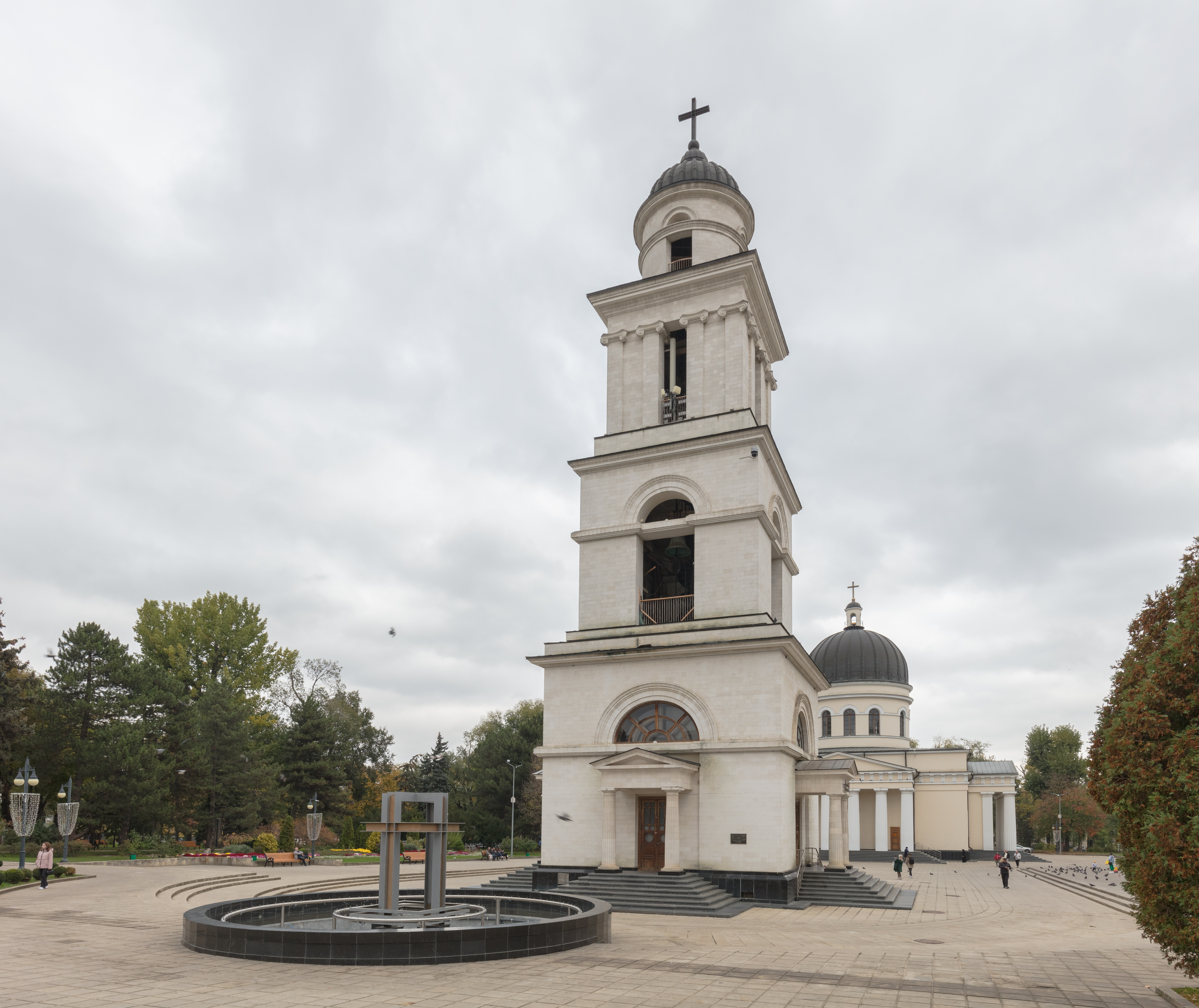
Belfry and cathedral

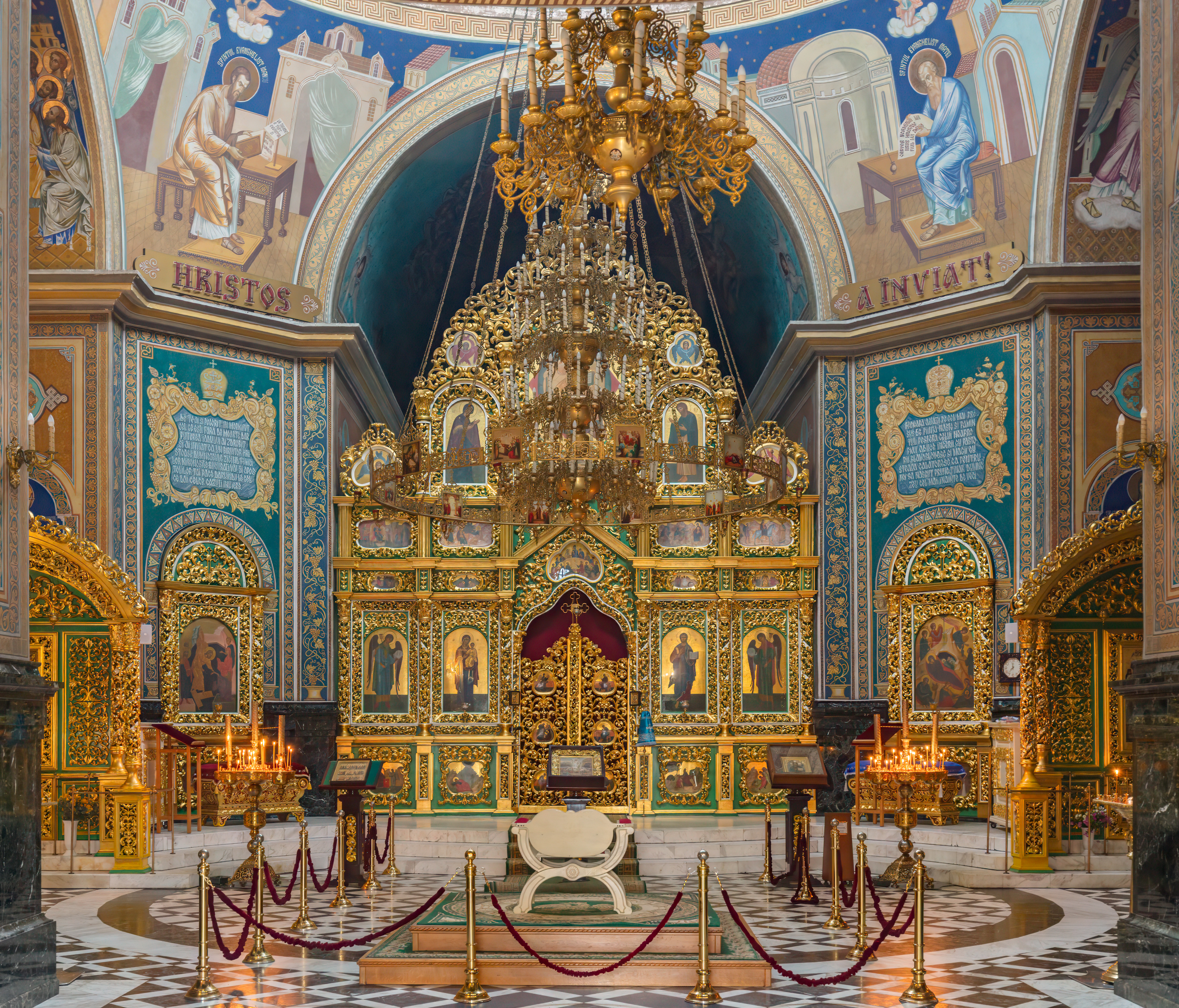
Iconostasis

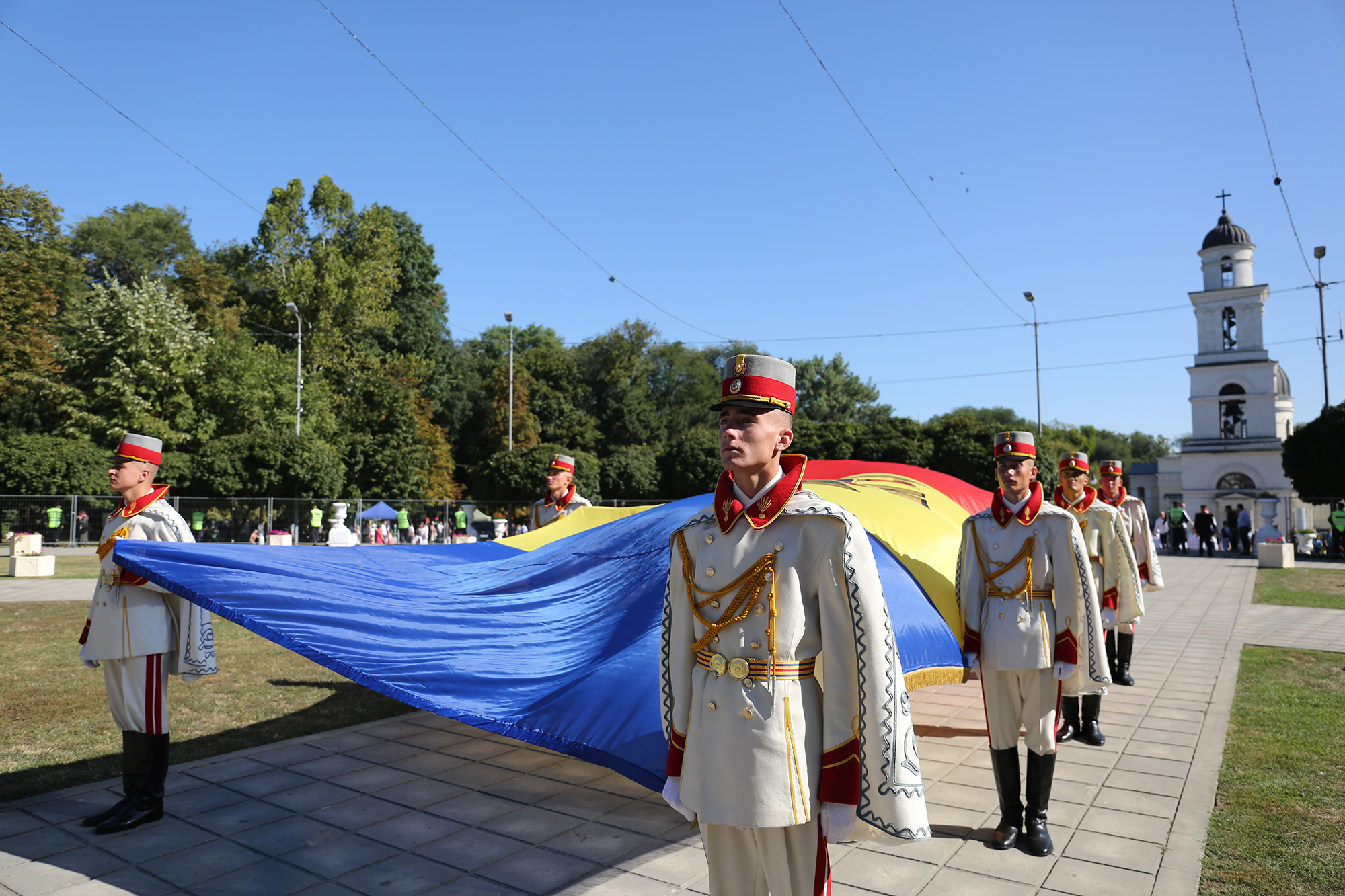
The Moldovan flag in front of the cathedral.

== See also ==
- Transfiguration Cathedral in Odesa
- Moldovan Orthodox Church
