= Avraam Melnikov =

- Авраам Иванович Мельников
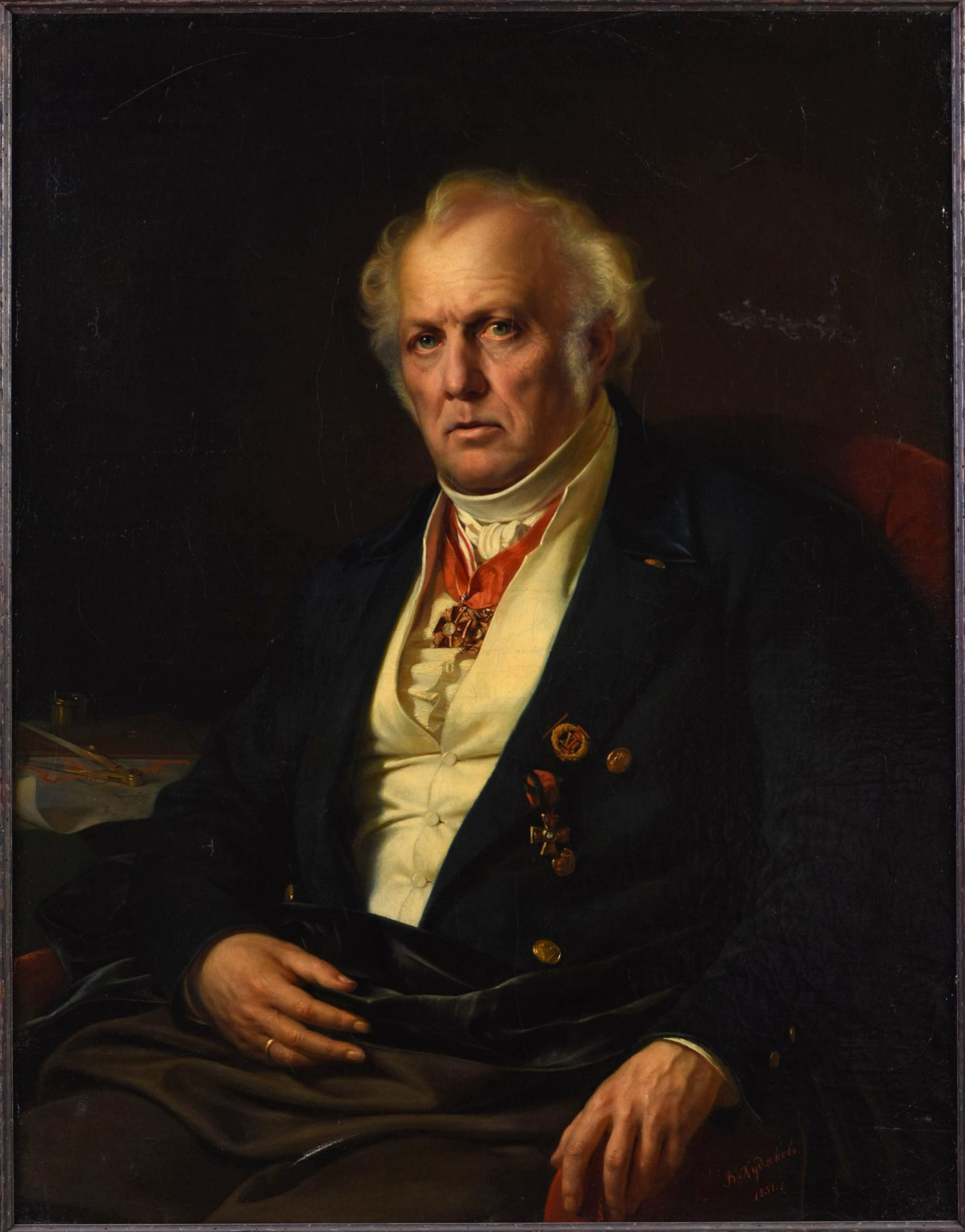
- Avraam Melnikov; portrait by Vasily Khudyakov (1851)
- Born: July 30, 1784; Oranienbaum
- Died: January 1, 1854 (aged 69); Saint Petersburg
- Education: Member Academy of Arts (1812); Professor by rank (1818)
- Alma mater: Imperial Academy of Arts (1807)
- Known for: Architecture
- Notable work: Potemkin Stairs
- Awards: Big Gold Medal of the Imperial Academy of Arts

Abram or Avraam Melnikov (Авраам Иванович Мельников; 1784—1854) was a Russian Neoclassical architect associated with the late phase of the Empire style. His teachers at the Imperial Academy of Arts included Andreyan Zakharov. He graduated with a gold medal and went to further his studies in Italy. Melnikov became de facto Dean of the Academy in 1831 but was not officially appointed until 1843.

Melnikov collaborated with sculptor Ivan Martos on the pedestals for his statues of Minin and Pozharsky in Red Square and Duc de Richelieu at the top of the Potemkin Stairs in Odessa. Apart from the Imperial School of Jurisprudence and the Old Believer Church of St. Nicholas (later converted into the Arctic and Antarctic Museum), Melnikov's major buildings are in New Russia and the Volga provinces.

The Saviour Cathedral in Rybinsk is based on Melnikov's design that had won the architectural competition for St. Isaac's Cathedral in St. Petersburg. It was also Melnikov who won the competition for the Cathedral of Christ the Saviour in Moscow. Neither design was approved by Alexander I of Russia. His successor, Nicholas I, also preferred the Russo-Byzantine designs of Konstantin Thon to the supposedly ponderous Late Neoclassical style espoused by Melnikov.

== Major buildings ==
- Arctic and Antarctic Museum
- Imperial School of Jurisprudence
- Potemkin Stairs, Odessa
- Nativity Cathedral, Chişinău
- Transfiguration Cathedral, Bolhrad
- Saviour Cathedral, Bolhrad.
- Semicircular Square, Odessa
- Kazan Cathedral, Yaroslavl
- Saviour Cathedral, Rybinsk
- Demidov Lyceum, Yaroslavl
- St. Nicholas Cathedral, Mtsensk
- The cathedral belltower in Yaroslavl

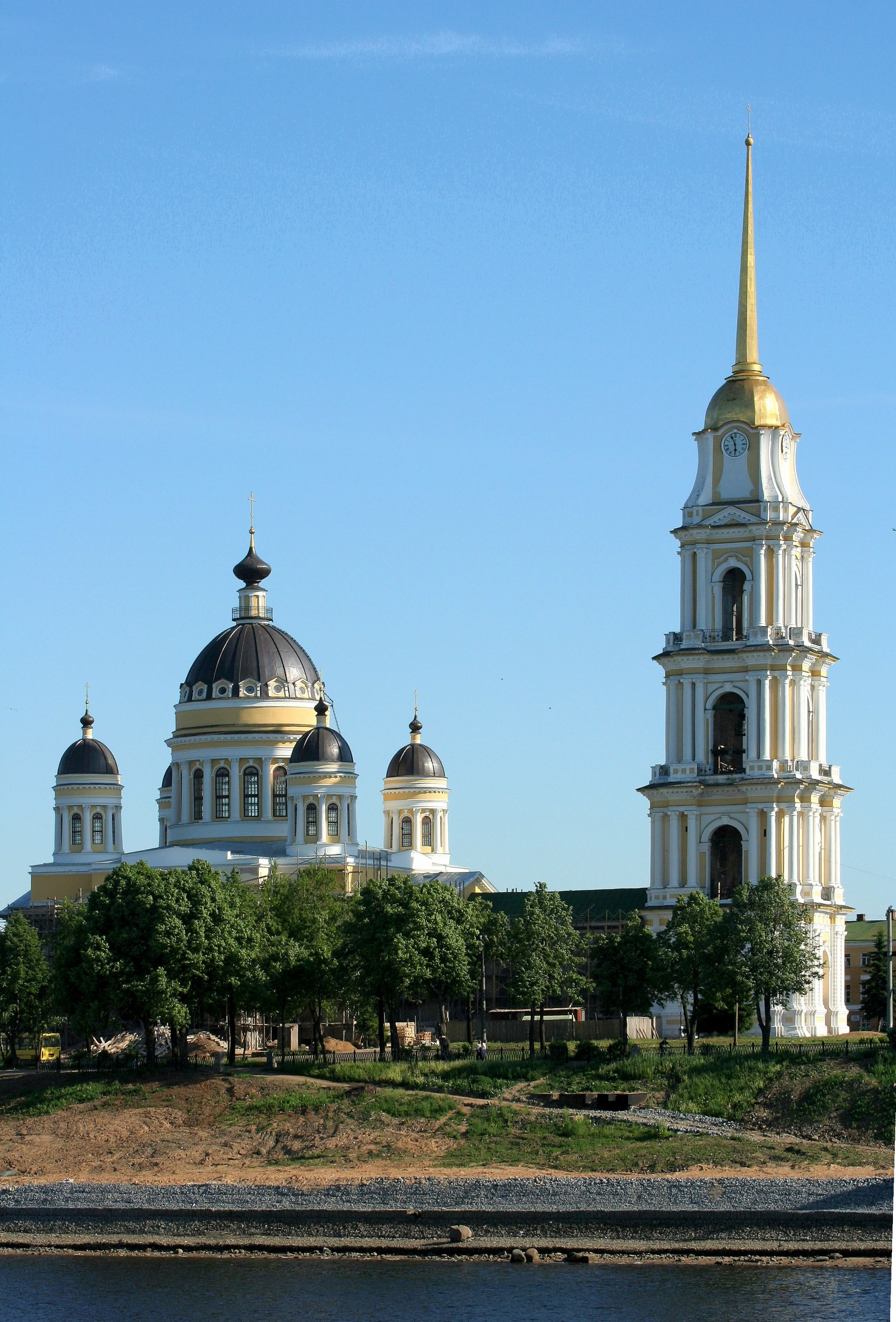
Saviour Cathedral Rybinsk

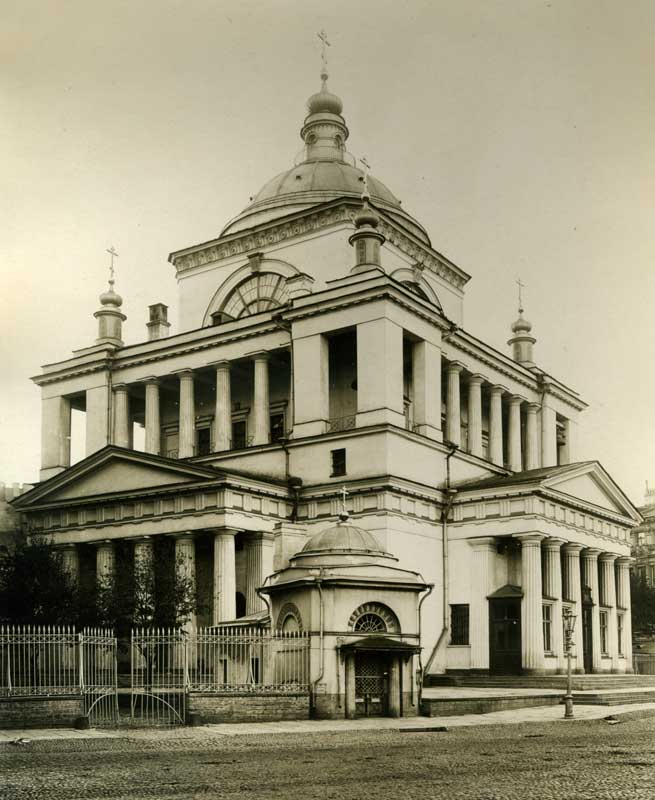
Old Believer Church of St. Nicholas, St. Petersburg

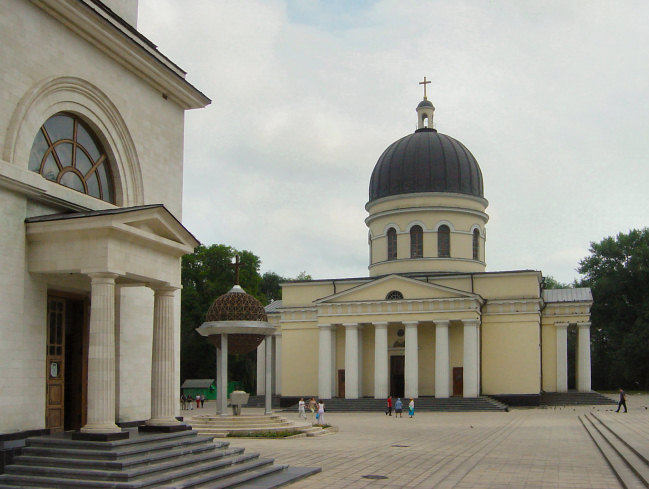
Nativity Cathedral, Chişinău

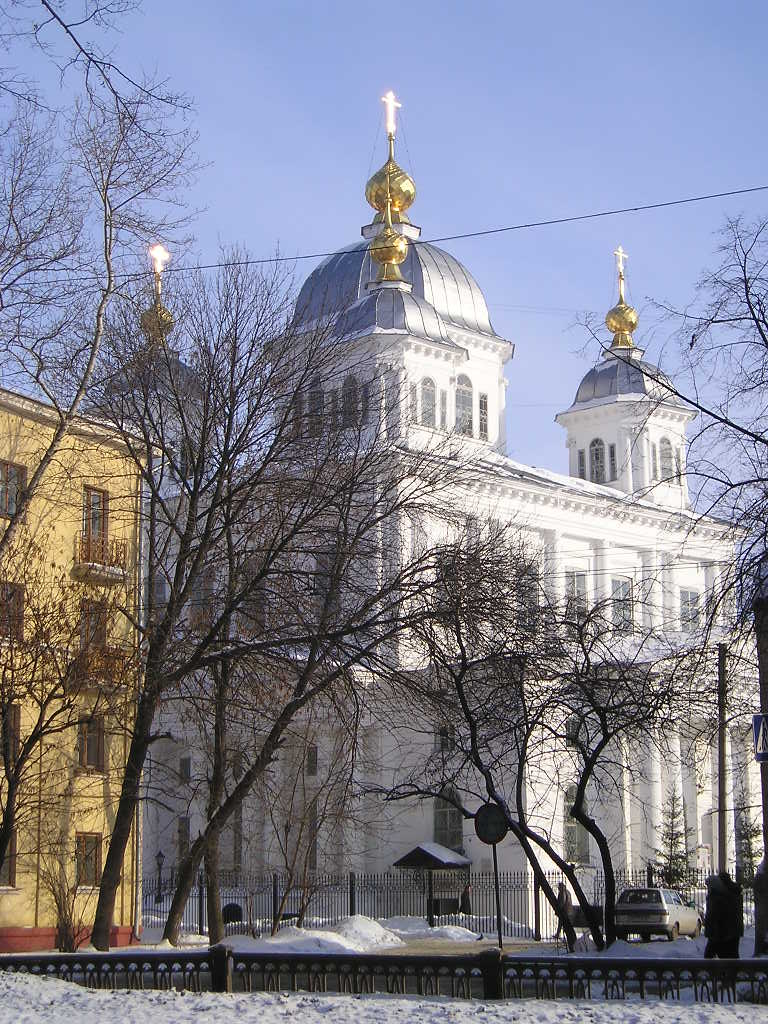
Kazan Cathedral, Yaroslavl

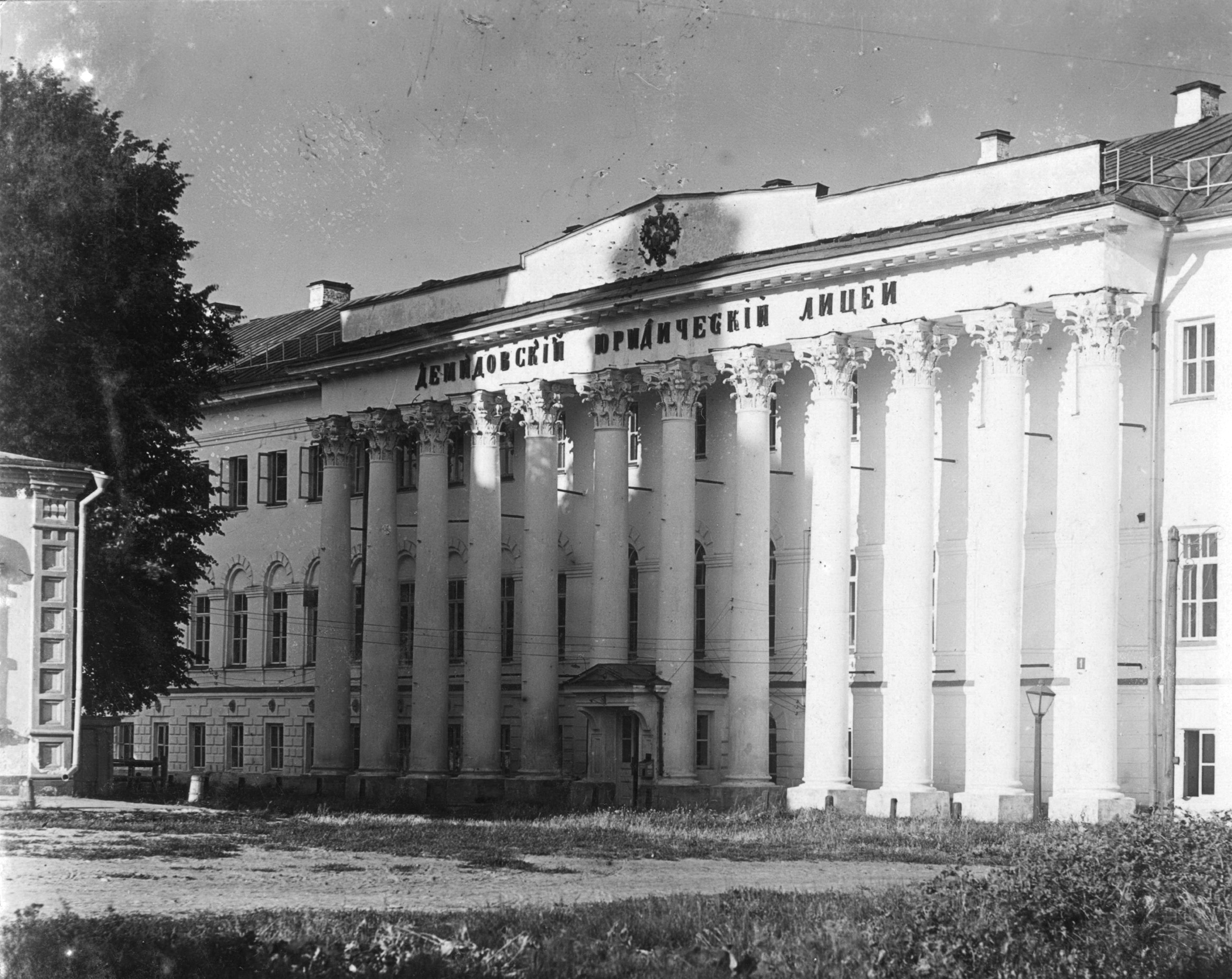
Demidov Lyceum, Yaroslavl

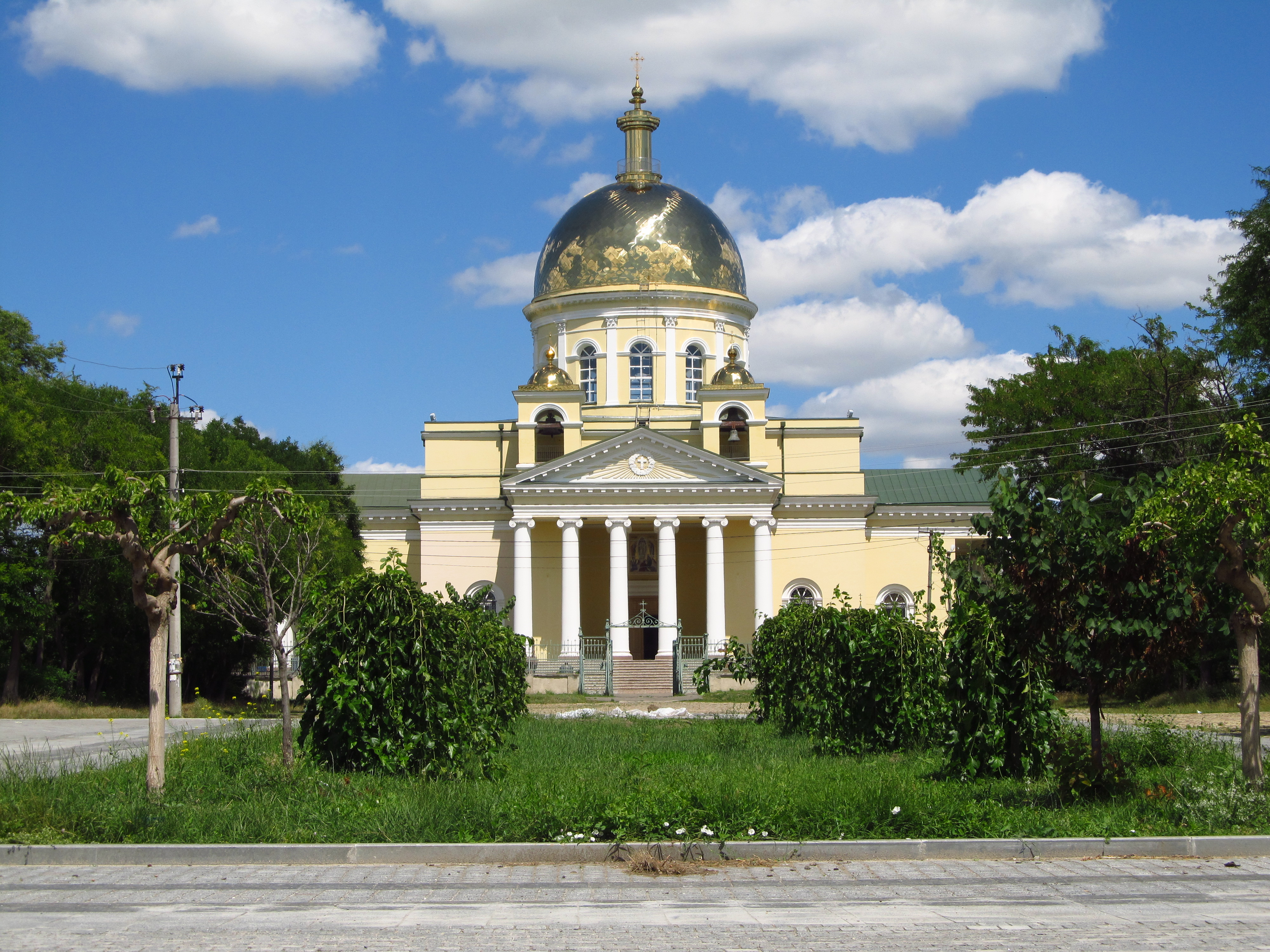
Transfiguration Cathedral, Bolgrad
