= Vladimir Sanin =

Personal information
- Nationality: Soviet
- Born: 12 December 1928
- Died: 12 March 1983 (aged 54)

Vladimir Markovich Sanin (Russian: Влади́мир Ма́ркович Са́нин; 12 December 1928 – 12 March 1983) was a Soviet traveler and writer. He wrote numerous books on his travels, as well as some humorous stories. He devoted most of his work to the Antarctic.

Vladimir Sanin was born in Babruysk, in the Byelorussian SSR. As a young man, he fought in World War II. After the war, he graduated with an economics degree from Moscow State University in 1951. He worked in several firms as an economist and taught political economics.

His forays into writing started with humorous documentary short stories about his travels across the Soviet Union. During his travels in the north of the country, Sanin met with several polar explorers whose travails caught his imagination. He joined several polar expeditions, including living on the drifting ice-floe "North Pole-15". Sanin wrote a series of books about people who live and explore the Arctic and the Antarctic (72 Degrees Below Zero, Newbie in the Antarctic, Don't say goodbye to the Arctic, On top of the Earth). Some of these books were made into movies.

Sanin's writing explores the ethical and interpersonal issues of people in extreme situations with humor and affection. In addition to the polar explorers, his heroes include firefighters, pilots, captains, and avalanche rescuers.
