= Ovidiopol Raion =

Former subdivision of Odesa Oblast, Ukraine

Ovidiopol Raion Овідіопольський район Ovidiopolskyi Raion
- Raion
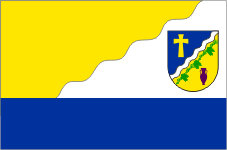
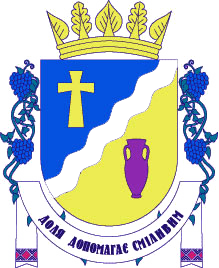
- Flag Coat of arms

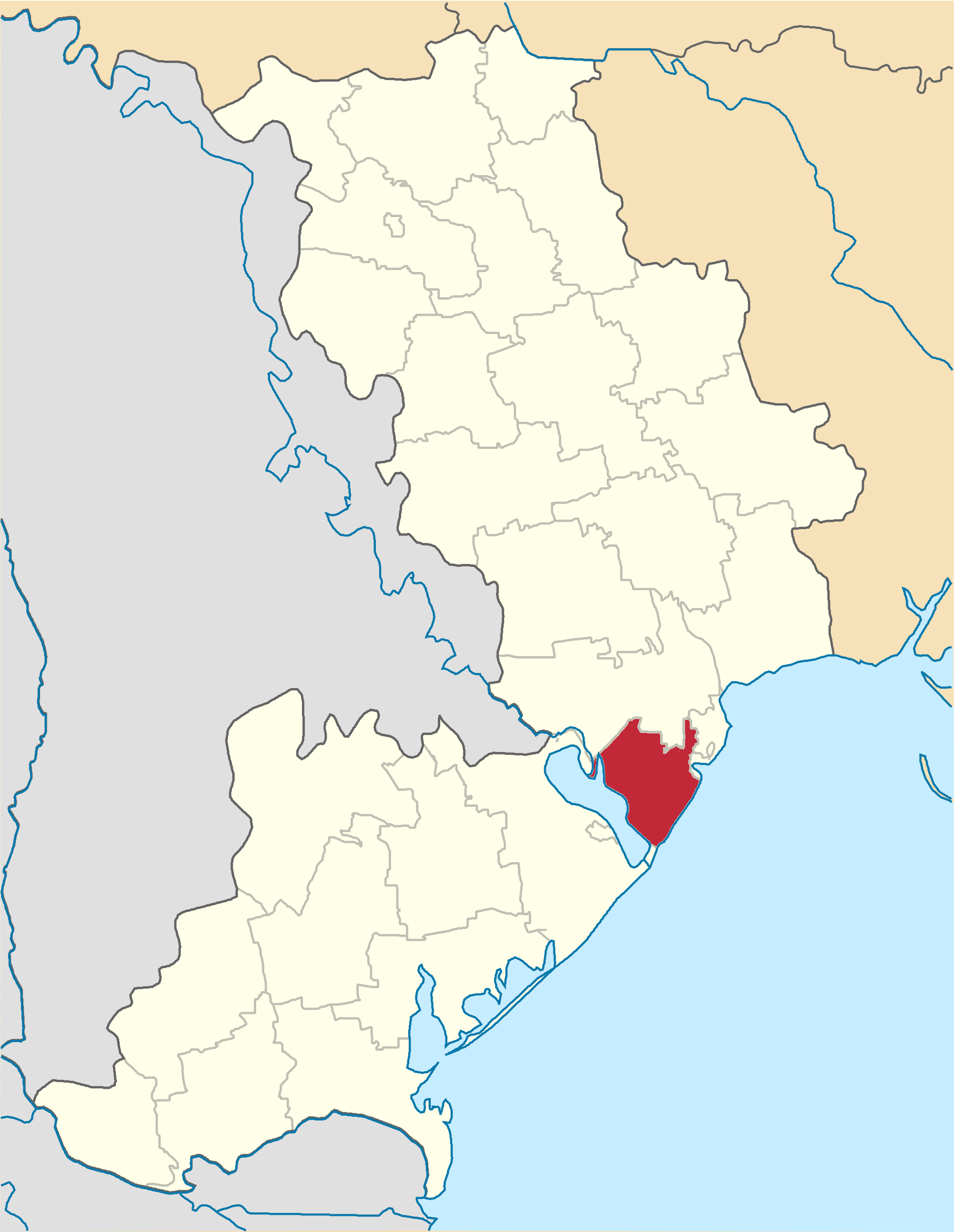
- Coordinates: 46°16′45″N 30°30′41″E
- Country: Ukraine
- Oblast: Odesa Oblast
- Founded: 1924
- Abolished, merged: 18 July 2020 (into Odesa Raion)
- Admin. center: Ovidiopol

Population (2015)
  - Total: ▲77,278
- Time zone: UTC+02:00 (EET)
  - Summer (DST): UTC+03:00 (EEST)
- Postal index: 67800—67851
- Area code: +380 4851
- Website: http://ovidiopol-rda.odessa.gov.ua

Ovidiopol Raion (Ukrainian: Овідіопольський район) was a raion (district) in Odesa Oblast of Ukraine. Its administrative center was the urban-type settlement of Ovidiopol. The raion was abolished and its territory was merged into Odesa Raion on 18 July 2020 as part of the administrative reform of Ukraine, which reduced the number of raions of Odesa Oblast to seven. The area of Ovidiopol Raion was split between Bilhorod-Dnistrovskyi and Odesa Raions. According to the 2001 census, the majority of the population of the Ovidiopol district was Ukrainian -speaking (69.64%), with a minority of Russian speakers (27.76%). The last estimate of the raion population was 77,278 (2015 est.).

At the time of disestablishment, the raion consisted of six hromadas:

- Avanhard settlement hromada with the administration in the urban-type settlement of Avanhard, transferred to Odesa Raion;
- Dalnyk rural hromada with the administration in the selo of Dalnyk, transferred to Odesa Raion;
- Karolino-Buhaz rural hromada with the administration in the selo of Karolino-Buhaz, transferred to Bilhorod-Dnistrovskyi Raion;
- Ovidiopol settlement hromada with the administration in Ovidiopol, transferred to Odesa Raion;
- Tairove settlement hromada with the administration in the urban-type settlement of Tairove, transferred to Odesa Raion;
- Velykodolynske settlement hromada with the administration in the urban-type settlement of Velykodolynske, transferred to Odesa Raion.

The population of the district was 60,308 in 2001. According to the 2001 Ukrainian census the population was 79% Ukrainian, 15% Russian, 2% Moldovan, 1% Bulgarian, and 1% Belarusian.

The shore of the Black Sea formed the southeastern edge of the district and the shore of the Dniester Estuary formed the southwestern edge.
