= Dalnyk (disambiguation) =

Dalnyk is a small steppe river in Odesa Raion of Odesa Oblast, Ukraine.

Dalnyk may also refer to:

- Dalnyk, Ukraine, a village in Odesa Raion of Odesa Oblast, Ukraine
- Dalnyk rural hromada, a rural hromada in Odesa Raion of Odesa Oblast, Ukraine
- Velykyi Dalnyk, a village in Odesa Raion of Odesa Oblast, Ukraine
- Velykyi Dalnyk rural hromada, a rural hromada in Odesa Raion of Odesa Oblast, Ukraine
