= Sukhyi Estuary =

Estuary in Odesa region, Ukraine

Coordinates: 46°20′N 30°38′E

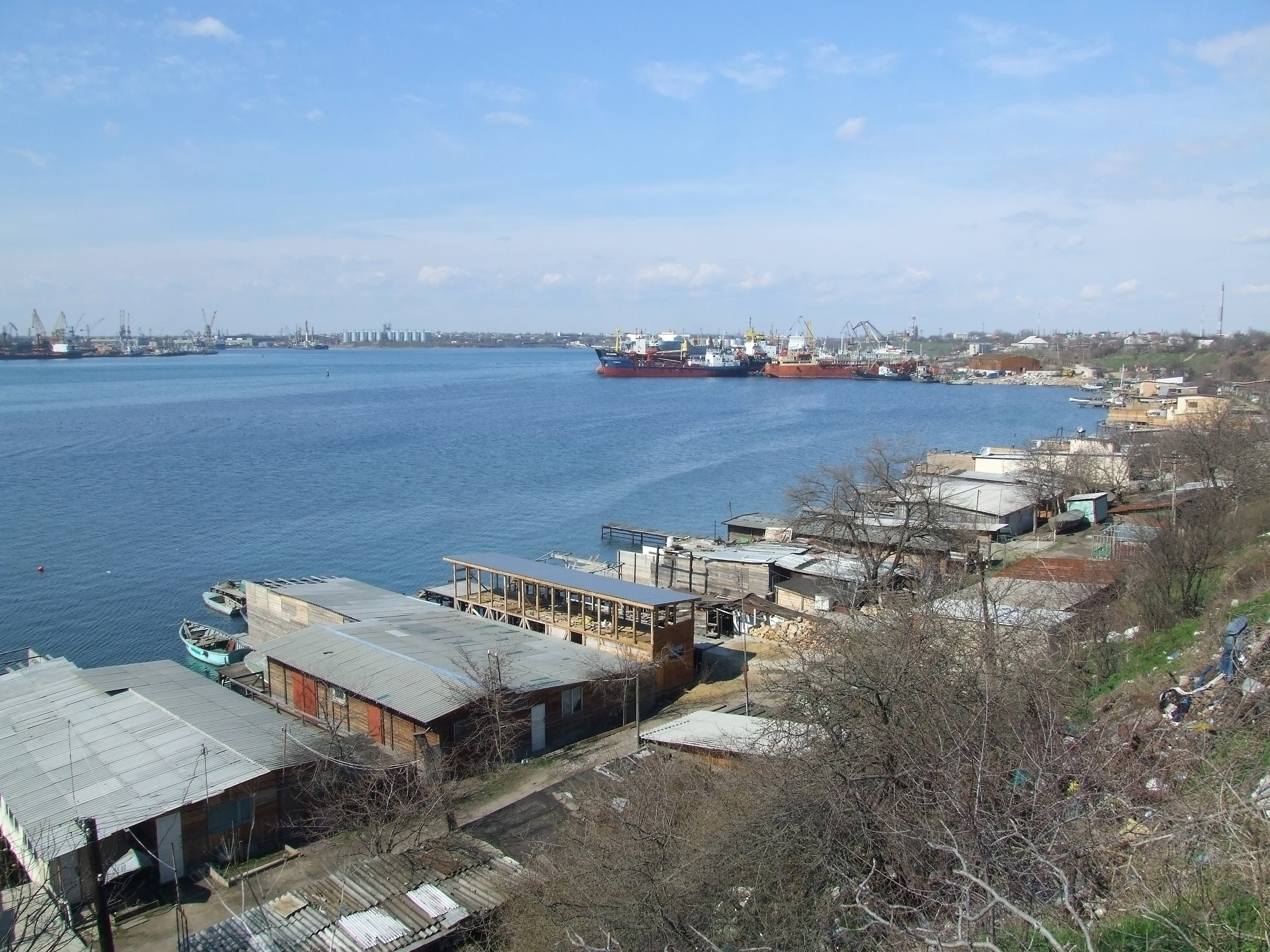
- View to marine part of the estuary

- Location within Odesa Oblast
- Location: Black Sea
- River sources: Dalnyk River, Akkarzhanka River
- Ocean/sea sources: Atlantic Ocean
- Basin countries: Ukraine
- Max. length: 7.2 km (4.5 mi)
- Max. width: 1.5 km (0.93 mi)
- Surface area: 5.7 km^{2} (2.2 sq mi)
- Average depth: 7.3 m (24 ft)
- Max. depth: 14 m (46 ft)
- Salinity: 10-18 ‰
- Settlements: Odesa, Chornomorsk

The Sukhyi Estuary, or Sukhyi Lyman (Ukrainian: Сухий лиман, lit. 'dried estuary'), is on open estuary in the north-western Black Sea, near the cities of Odesa and Chornomorsk, Ukraine. In 1957 the estuary was connected to the sea via 14-m depth navigation canal, therefore the water body de facto transformed to the marine bay. Upper site of the estuary is more shallow, up to 1.5 m depth. Northern and western parts are separated by artificial dam and transformed to fresh water ponds. The Dalnyk River inflows to the estuary.

== History and characteristics ==
Its modern name, "Dry Estuary", the water body have got in the time when it was isolated from the Black Sea. That time the estuary dried regularly, sometime up to 1 km² area. The earlier name is Kleinliebenthal Estuary, originates from the German: Kleinliebenthal, "Small valley of love". The name of the water body was given by German colonists. The upper part of the estuary is located in two valleys:

- Kleinliebenthal, lit. "Small valley of love". The main part of the estuary is located in this valley. The Dalnyk River inflows in this part. On the coast is a village Malodolynske (old name is Kleinliebenthal).
- Großliebenthal, lit. "Grand valley of love". In this valley is a bay, into which the Akkarzhanka River inflows. On the coast is a village Velykodolynske (old name is Großliebenthal).

The estuary is a place of spawning and feeding of fish, such as flounder, gobies (the grass goby is most numerous), sand-smelts, mullets.

== Gallery ==
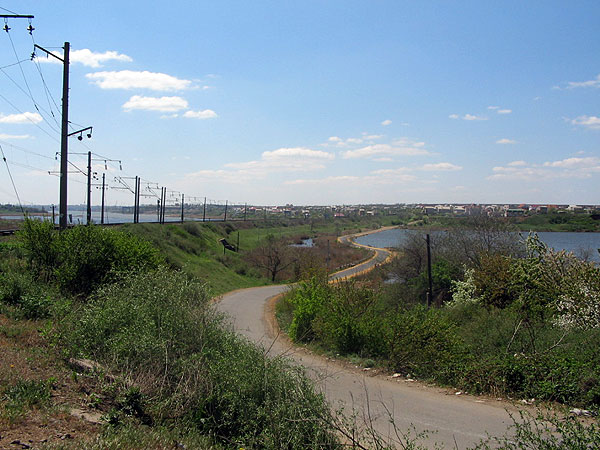
Crassing though the estuary

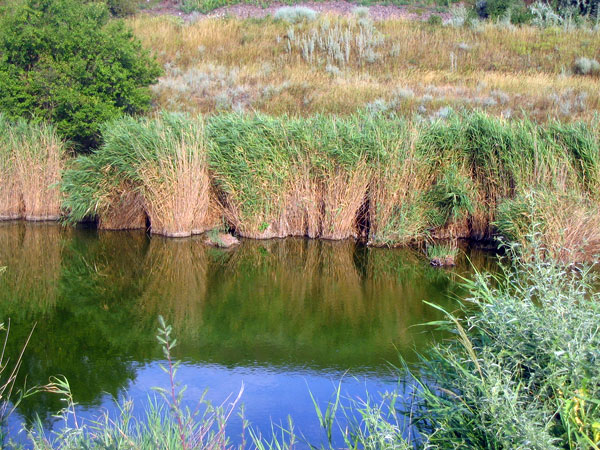
On the coast

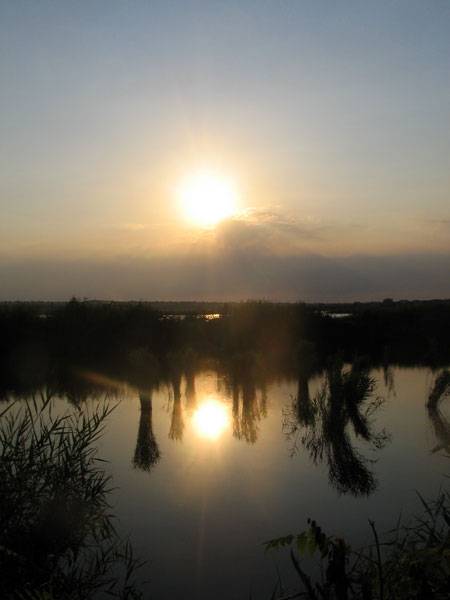
Sunset on the Sukhyi Estuary

== See also ==
- Berezan Estuary
- Tylihul Estuary
- Khadzhibey Estuary
- Dniester Estuary
- Small Adzhalyk Estuary
