= Akkarzhanka =

- Location of mouth
- Native name: Аккаржанка (Ukrainian)

Location
- Country: Ukraine
- Oblast: Odesa

Physical characteristics
- Source
  - location: near the village of Berezan
- Mouth
  - location: Sukhyi Estuary
  - coordinates: approx. 46°20′N 30°38′E
- Length: 39 km (24 mi)
- Basin size: 160 km^{2} (62 sq mi)

Akkarzhanka (Ukrainian: Аккаржанка) is a small steppe river in Odesa Raion of Odesa Oblast, Ukraine. The river has origin near the village of Berezan, inflows to the Sukhyi Estuary in its north-western part, near the urban-type settlement of Velykodolynske.

The length of the river 39 km (24 mi), the watershed area is 160 km^{2} (62 sq mi). It is fed mainly by rain and meltwater, with some minor contributions from underground runoff.

== Species ==
Using kick-nets and sampling a fish pond and the Oleksandrivka Reservoir in the river in 2018, a study found several specimens of the Macrobrachium nipponense (Oriental river prawn), which is an invasive species, within the river with estimated densities of up to 15 individuals per square meter. Young individuals were consistently present, indicating reproduction in the river.

== Status ==
Reports from a commission in 2023 reported ongoing drying out and siltation of the river, and that there needed to be an attempt to clear the sources that feed the river. Authorities from the rural settlement of Velykodolynske agreed to develop a project for cleaning the river, increasing control over compliance with environmental protection zones, and removing illegal structures that block access to the river in order to remedy the situation.
