= Seventh-Kilometer Market =

Outdoor market in Odesa, Ukraine

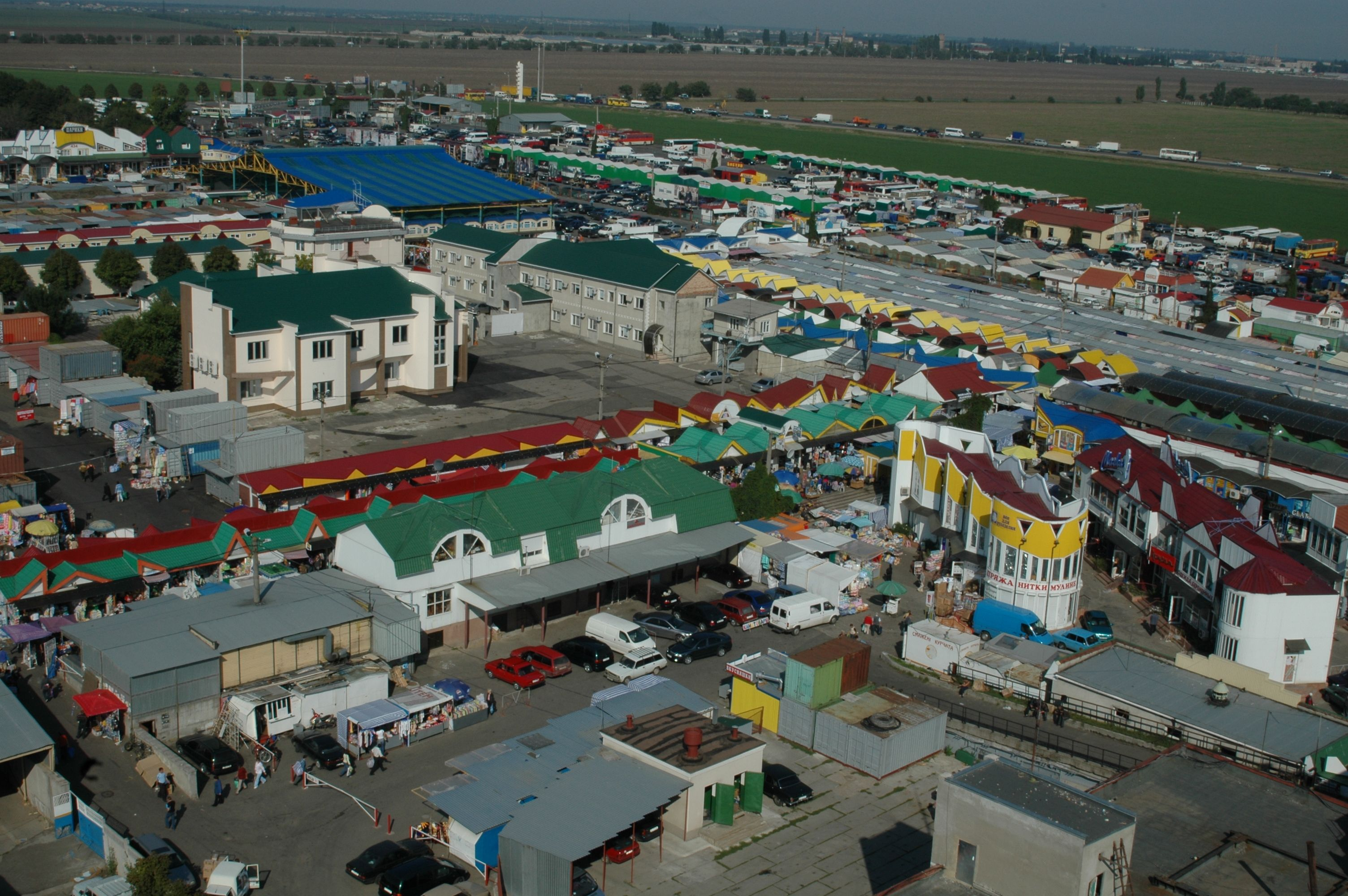
- Ariel view toward the main entrance
- Location: Базова вулиця, 20, Avanhard, Odesa Oblast, 67806, Ukraine; Avanhard, Odesa Raion, Odesa Oblast; 46.439444°N 30.638889°E
- Opening date: December 19, 1989
- Goods sold: a wide variety
- Number of tenants: ~10,000
- Total retail floor area: 74 hectares (0.29 mi^{2}) (and another 40 hectares (0.15 mi^{2}) hectares of undeveloped territory)
- Website: 7km.net
- Interactive map of Seventh-Kilometer Market

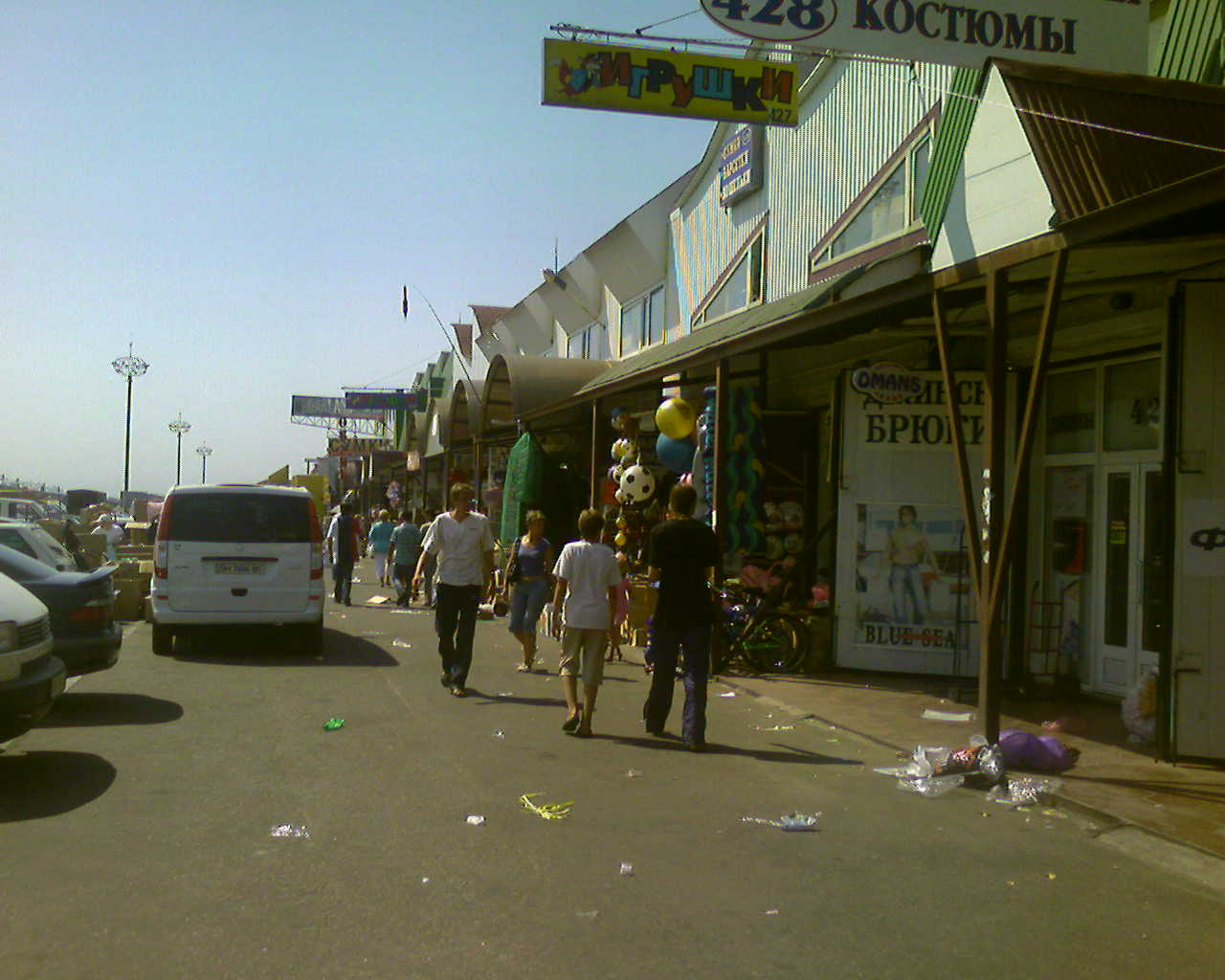
Market "Seventh-Kilometer"

The Seventh-Kilometer Market (Ukrainian: Ринок «Сьомий кілометр», Rynok Siomyi Kilometr) is a vast outdoor market in Avanhard on the outskirts of Odesa, Ukraine.

== Description ==
Originally, in the 1960s and 1970s, it was open only on Sundays (later on Saturdays) in Slobidka, near the 3rd Jewish cemetery on Khimichna Street, at the time a small walled-in area of 150 m wide and 250 m long, hence totally inadequate for a market and where an association with shoving originated. The new version was founded in 1989 during Perestroika reforms; it is now possibly the largest market in Europe.

When founded as an Odesa flea market in the 1960s, the market was officially restricted to selling used items only, but entry was charged to anyone entering with anything held in their hands because new items would be sold by traders from their hands (з рук) walking the market as opposed to used goods sold off the ground displays. The market was open until 3–4 pm, but owing to the difficulty in reaching it, which until 1966 involved a 2 km walk from the nearest tram (No. 15) stop; it was paramount to reach the market very early in the morning as all worthwhile goods were sold by 10–11 am.

When relocated in 1989, it was to an area outside the city's limits at the seventh kilometer of the Odesa–Ovidiopol highway, thus acquiring its name. As of 2006, the market covered 170 acres (0.69 km^{2}) and consists largely of steel shipping containers, which rent for up to US$6,000 (EUR 4,700) or more per month, as well as an increasing number of ordinary shops in buildings. It has roughly 6,000 traders and an estimated 150,000 customers per day. Daily sales, according to the Ukrainian periodical Dzerkalo Tyzhnia, were believed to be as high as US$20 million in 2004. With a staff of 1,200 (mostly guards and janitors), the market is also the region's largest employer. It is owned by local land and agriculture tycoon Viktor Dobrianskyi and three partners of his.

The independent traders on the market sell goods in all price ranges, from authentic merchandise to all sorts of cheap Asian consumer goods, including many counterfeit Western luxury goods. According to the impressions of S. L. Myers of The New York Times who visited the market in 2006,

"the market is part third-world bazaar, part post-Soviet Walmart, a place of unadulterated and largely unregulated capitalism where certain questions — about salaries, rents, taxes or last names — are generally met with suspicion."

Dzerkalo Tyzhnia wrote in 2004 that

"it is a state within a state, with its own laws and rules. It has become a sinecure for the rich and a trade haven for the poor."

However, Ukrainian president Viktor Yushchenko announced in 2005 that he intended to enforce tax laws on the market's thriving shadow economy.

== See also ==
- Pryvoz Market, a historic market of Odesa
- Shipping container architecture
