= Pryvoz Market =

Food market in Odesa, Ukraine

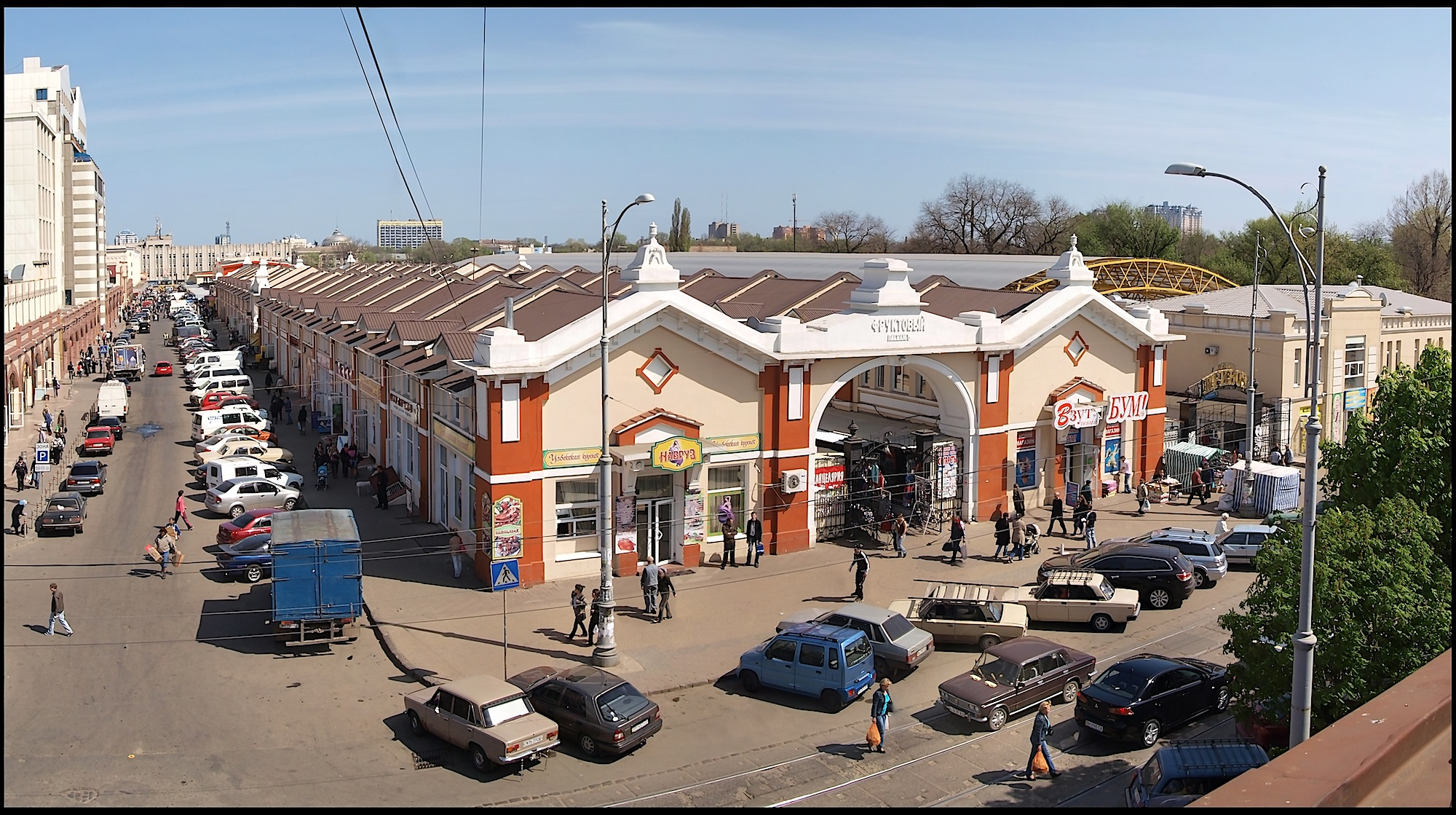
- Pryvoz Market in 2012
- Location: Privoznaya Street 14, Odesa Oblast, 65007, Ukraine; Prymorskyi District, Odesa, Odesa Raion, Odesa Oblast; 46.469722°N 30.7325°E
- Opening date: 1827
- Goods sold: a wide variety
- Number of tenants: hundreds
- Website: privoz-odessa.com.ua
- Interactive map of Pryvoz Market

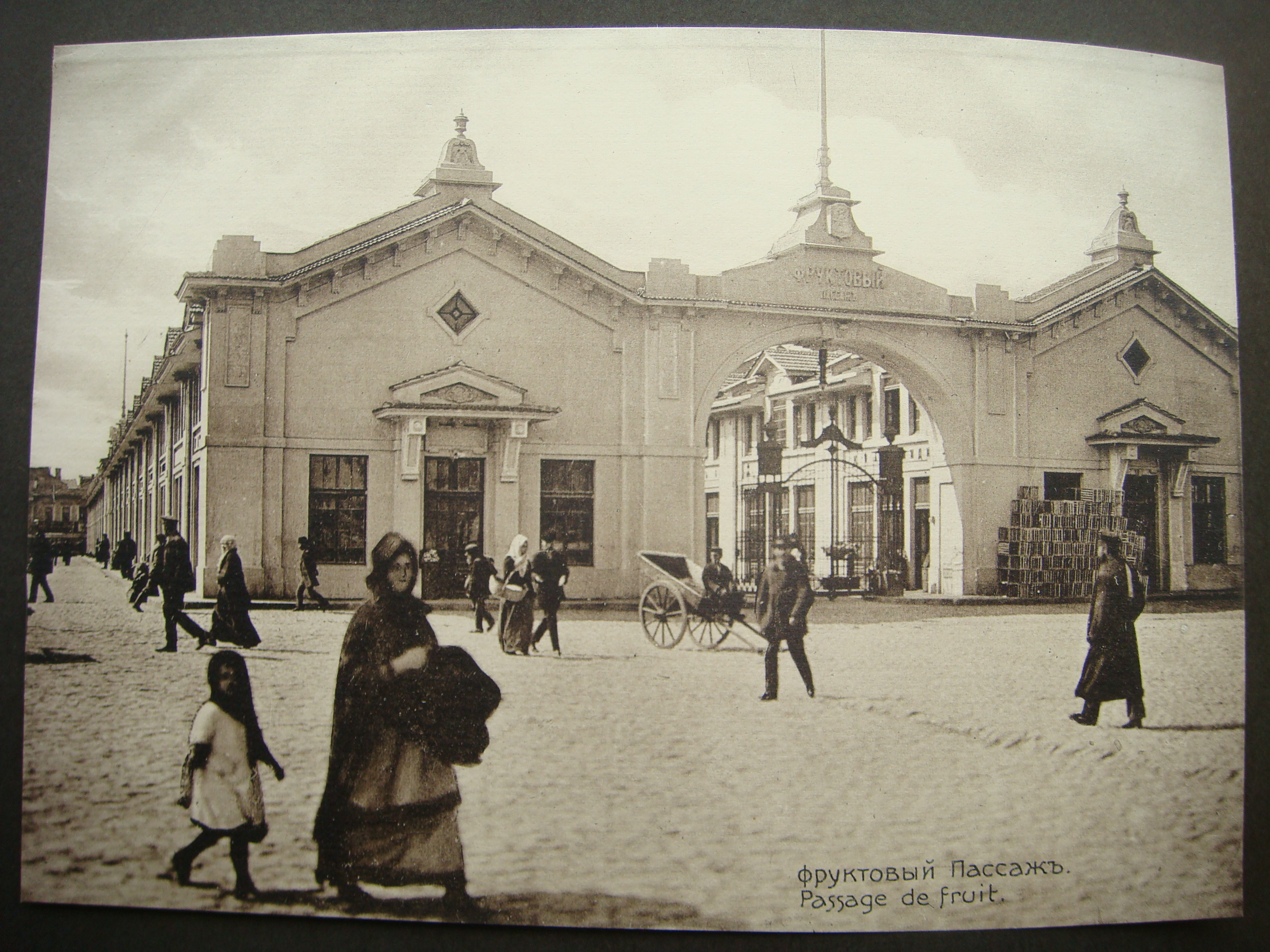
View of the Fruit Passage at Privoz in the early 20th century.

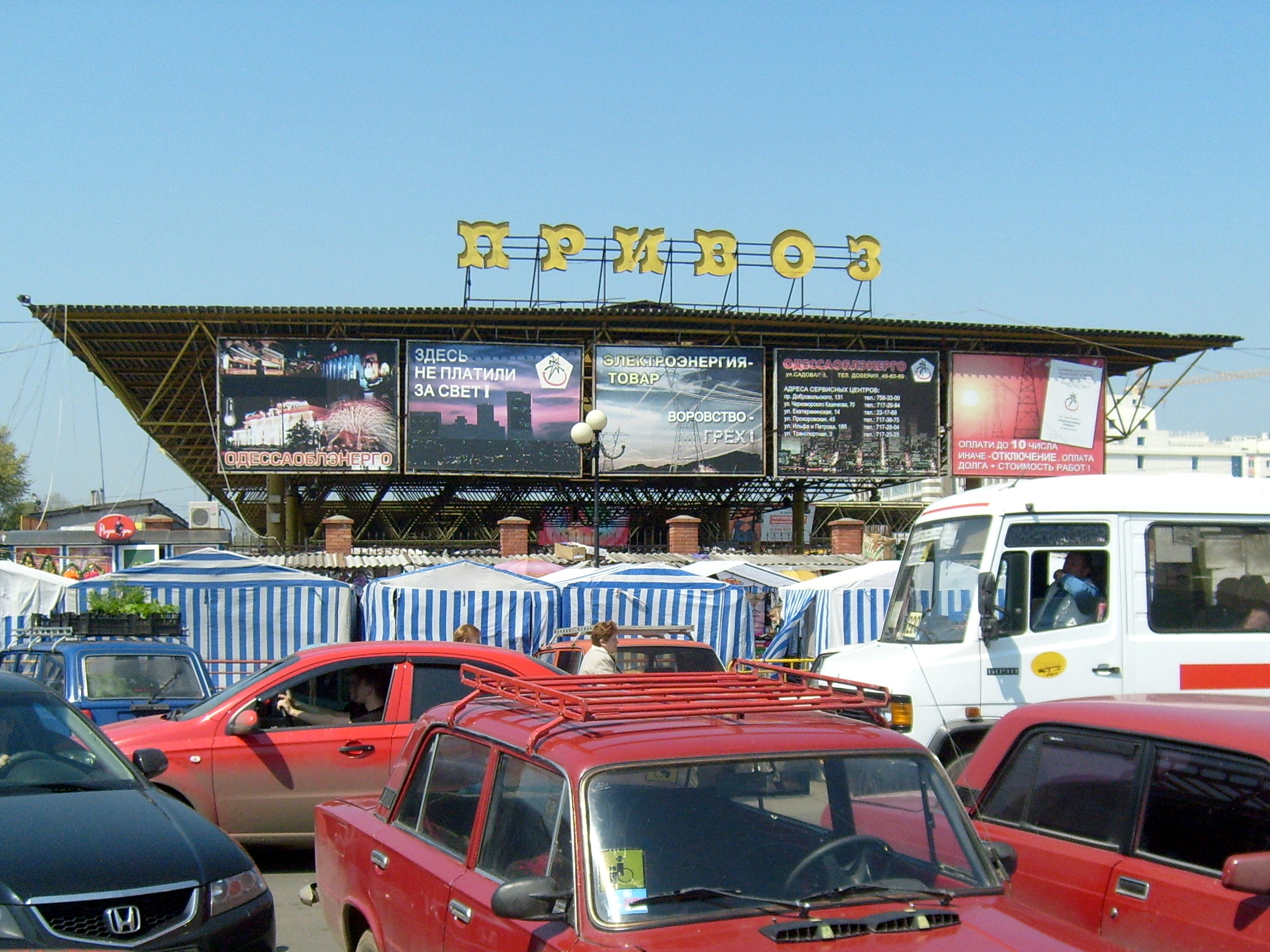
Entrance to Pryvoz Market in 2008

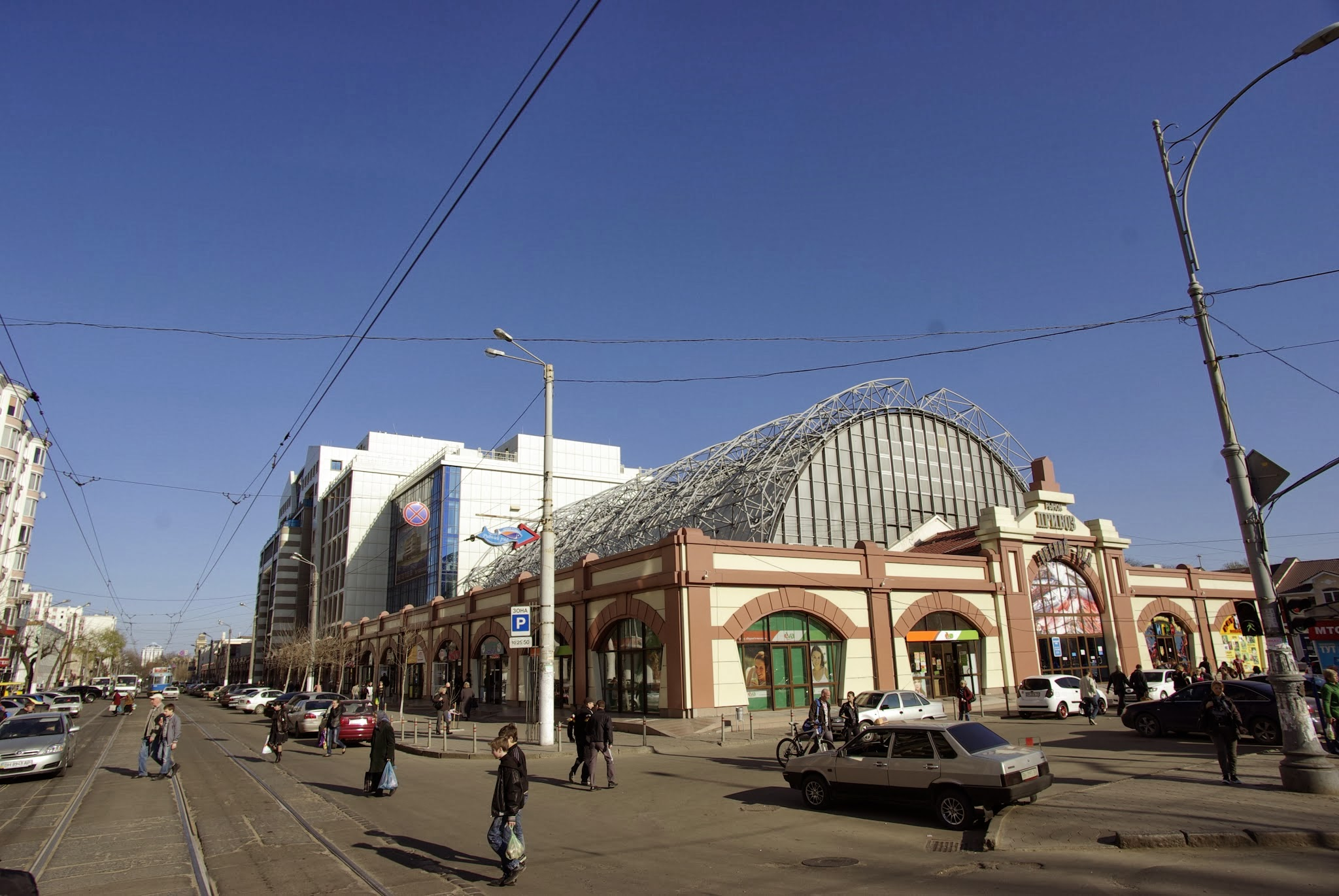
New Pryvoz in 2013

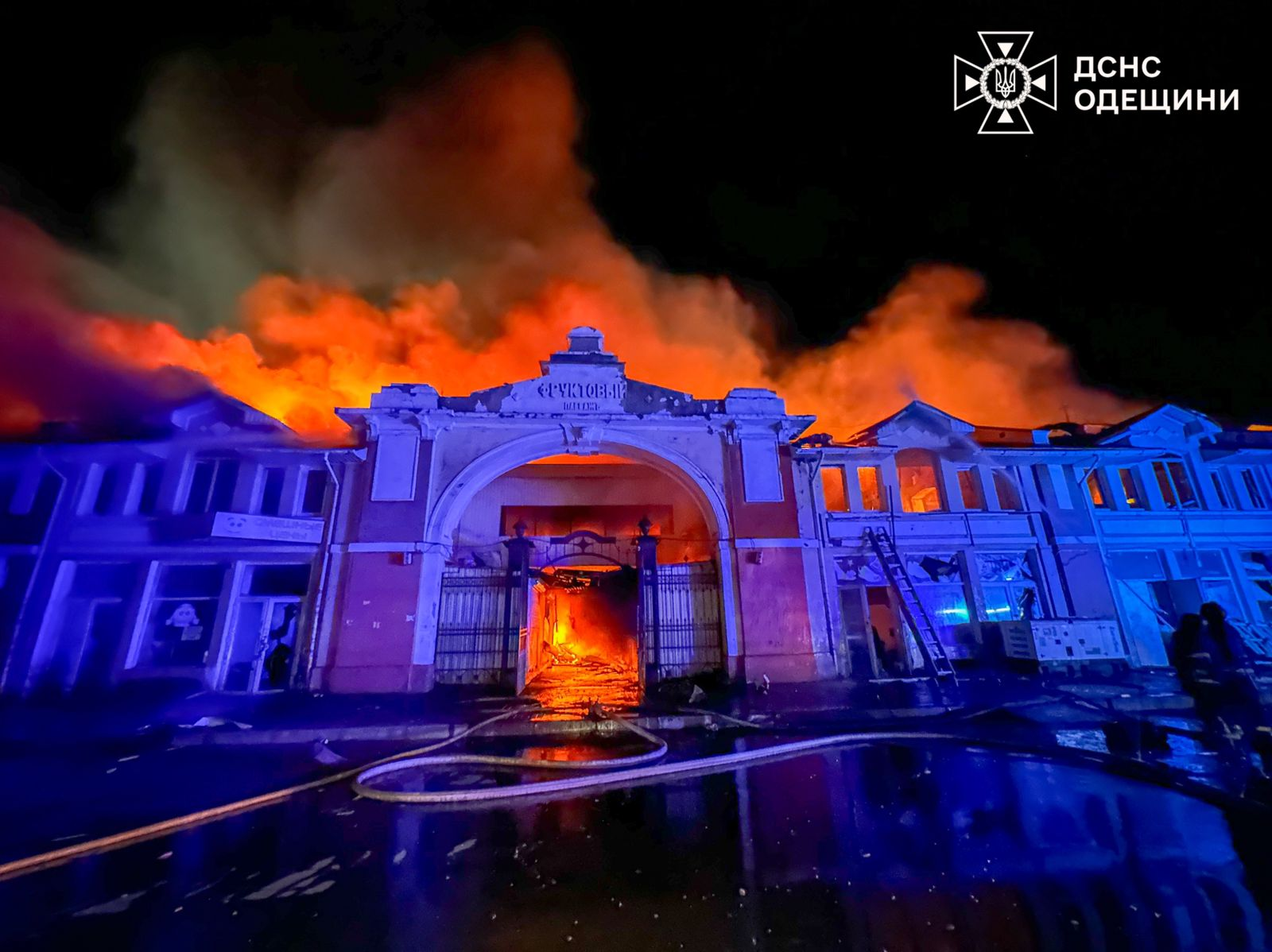
The Fruit Passage after a Russian strike in 2025

Pryvoz Market (Ukrainian: ринок Привоз), located at 14 Pryvozna Street, is the largest food market in Odesa, Ukraine.

== History ==
Pryvoz began in 1827, with wares sold from the back of horse-driven carts. The market was a large area where carts with goods that were sold at the local bazaar stopped. The place was a rather dirty, unpaved area, without capital buildings. Until the mid-1860s, the wheeler-dealers did not pay a market fee. Also, there was no own institution of measures and weights as in the ordinary market of those times.

Pryvoz adjoined the Stary (old) bazaar (also called the Volny (free) market), the first bazaar in Odesa.

The market was burned due to an outbreak of the plague and rebuilt in 1902. In 1904 the only architectural monument was built here, the Fruit Passage. Designed by the famous city architect Fedir Nesturkh, the Passage featured covered shopping galleries with arched entrances.

In 2007 a meat and fish corps appeared, after which a shopping center called "New Pryvoz" was built. As of 2021 the Odesa market is being restored and modified again, but it still does not lose its color and remains a place where they not only sell and buy, but also exchange the latest news.

On 24 July 2025, during the Russian invasion of Ukraine, the market was hit by a Russian UAV and suffered significant damage.

== Stories ==
In the 1940s zoo animals were moved from the Odesa zoo to Simferopol. Four-year-old elephant Murza (Мурза) escaped. It ran to the fruit section of the Pryvoz Market and ate several apples, pulled out pickled cucumbers from a barrel, and tasted some fresh cabbage and dried fruits. Murza was caught and returned to the zoo. A popular Soviet comedy film, Striped Trip was inspired by this incident.

In the 1920s, Pryvoz was led by the famous fraudster Jacob Pireman. One say he bought this post for a considerable bribe. Having become the head of the market, Pireman imposed a personal tribute to all merchants, and he also took hundreds of thousands of budget rubles to reconstruct the market and stole them. When Pireman's scam was uncovered, he was tried and shot. But one say that before the arrest, he hid a treasure, gold coins and diamonds on Pryvoz.

== People ==
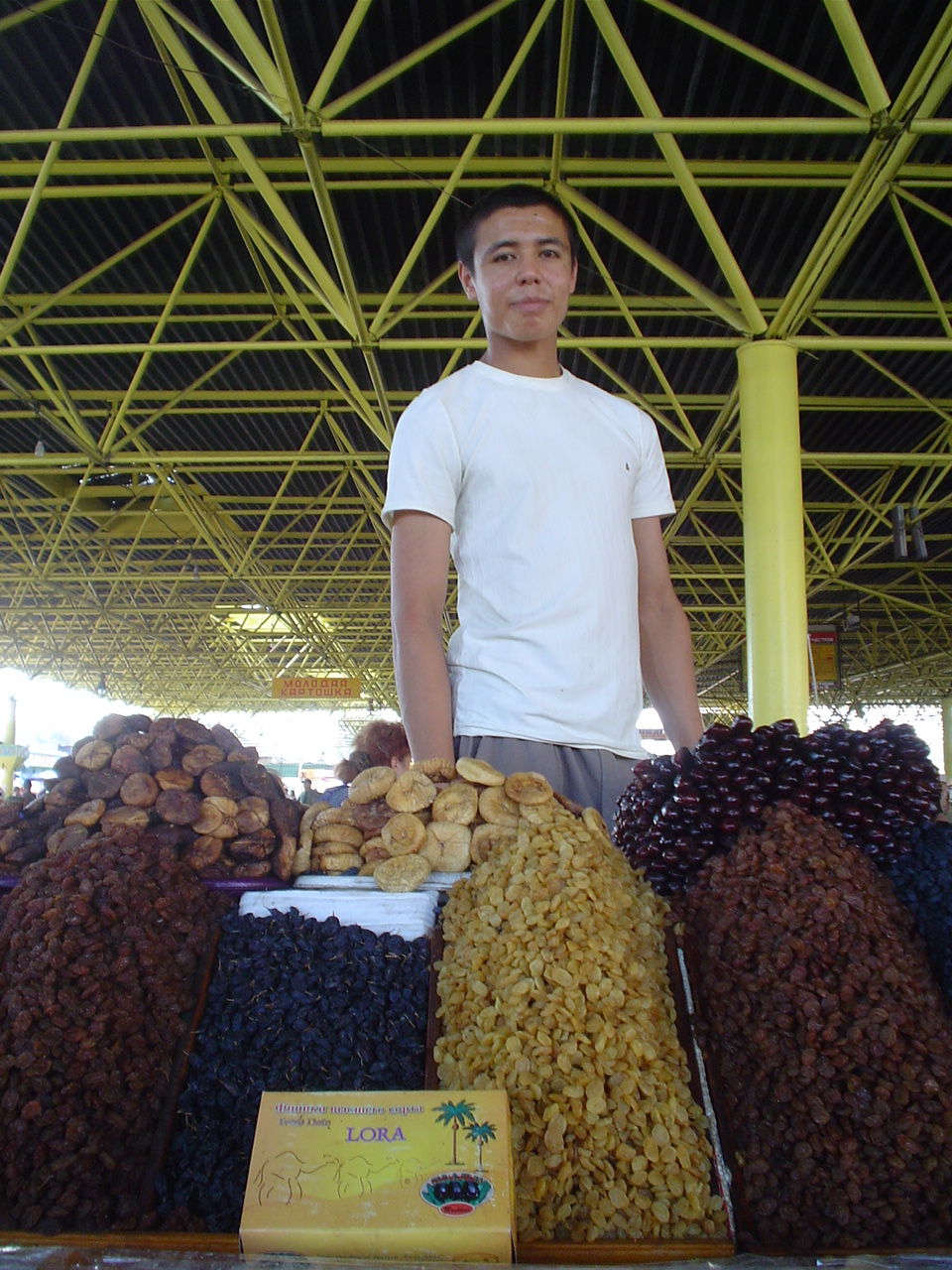
Vendor at Pryvoz Market

A Western journalist explained his visit to the market:

I headed over to Pryvoz Market, which is sort of like a cross between a department store on the one hand and a recycling center on the other. There's caviar, shoes, accessories, food, perfume, toiletries, things like that. And then there are the guys selling things like rusty old tools laid out on moth-eaten blankets. Or the old school five and a quarter inch floppy disk drives. There's even somebody selling wheels, just wheels, including a matching set of three that were obviously taken from a perambulator at some point.

Pryvoz was also mentioned in The Odesa Tales of Isaac Babel.

Moi sieur Jason, you are as scary as Monya the Artellerist firing out of two guns. I'd rather go to aunt Pece at Pryvoz and would buy a glass of sunflower seeds as you painfully interestingly 'goutareetye'.

== Gallery ==
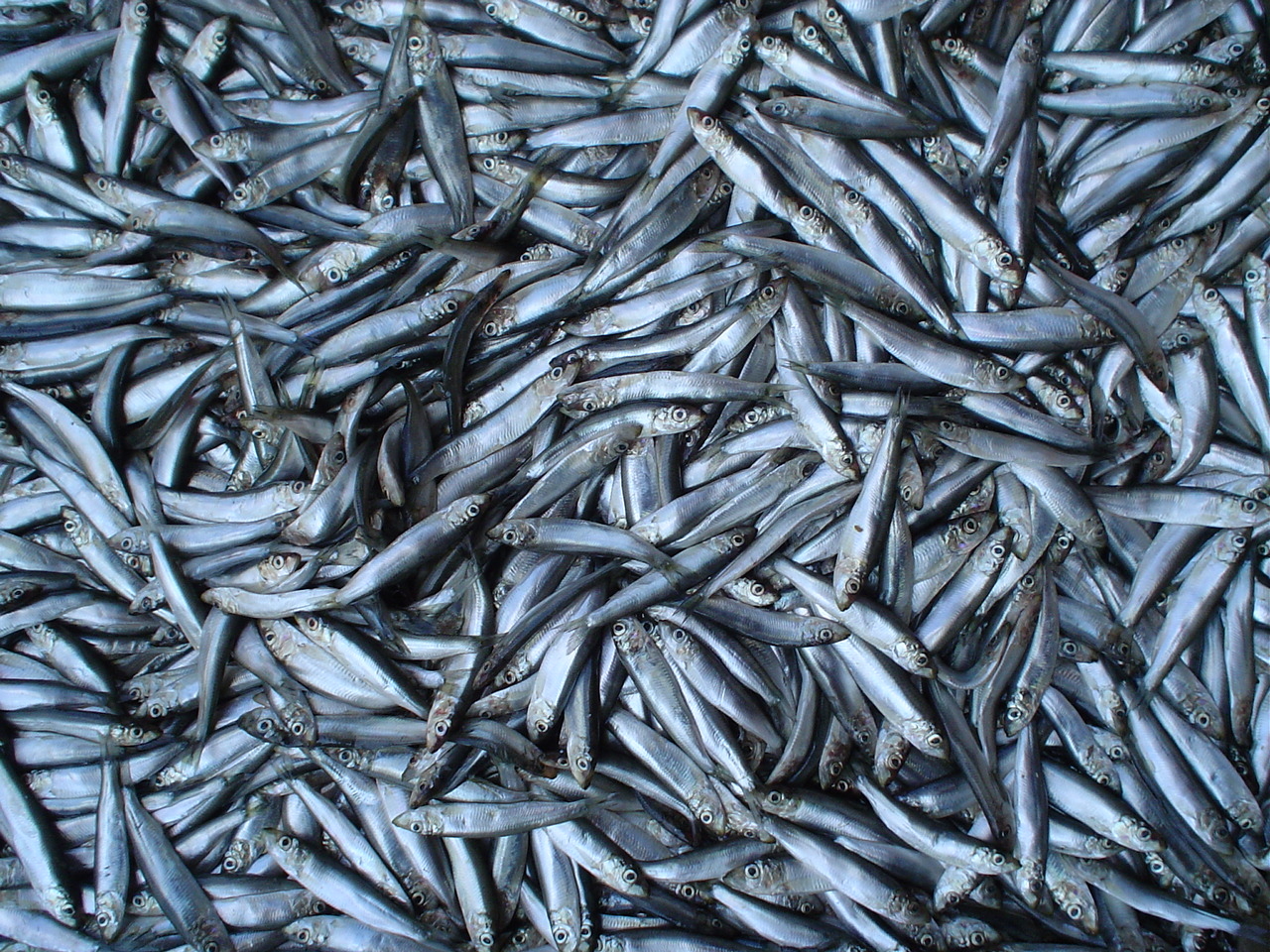
The famous Odesa sprat

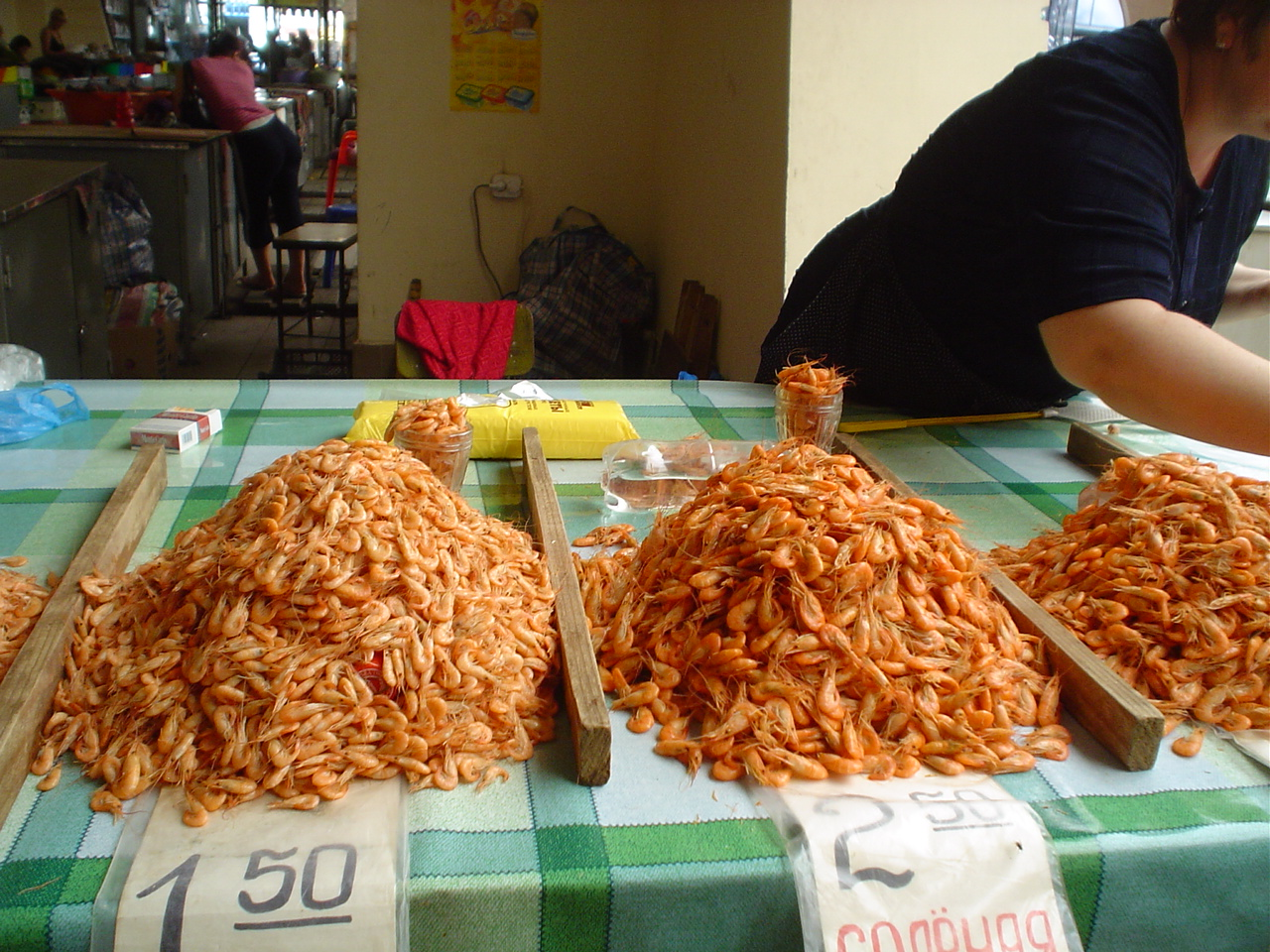
Boiled shrimp (prawns)

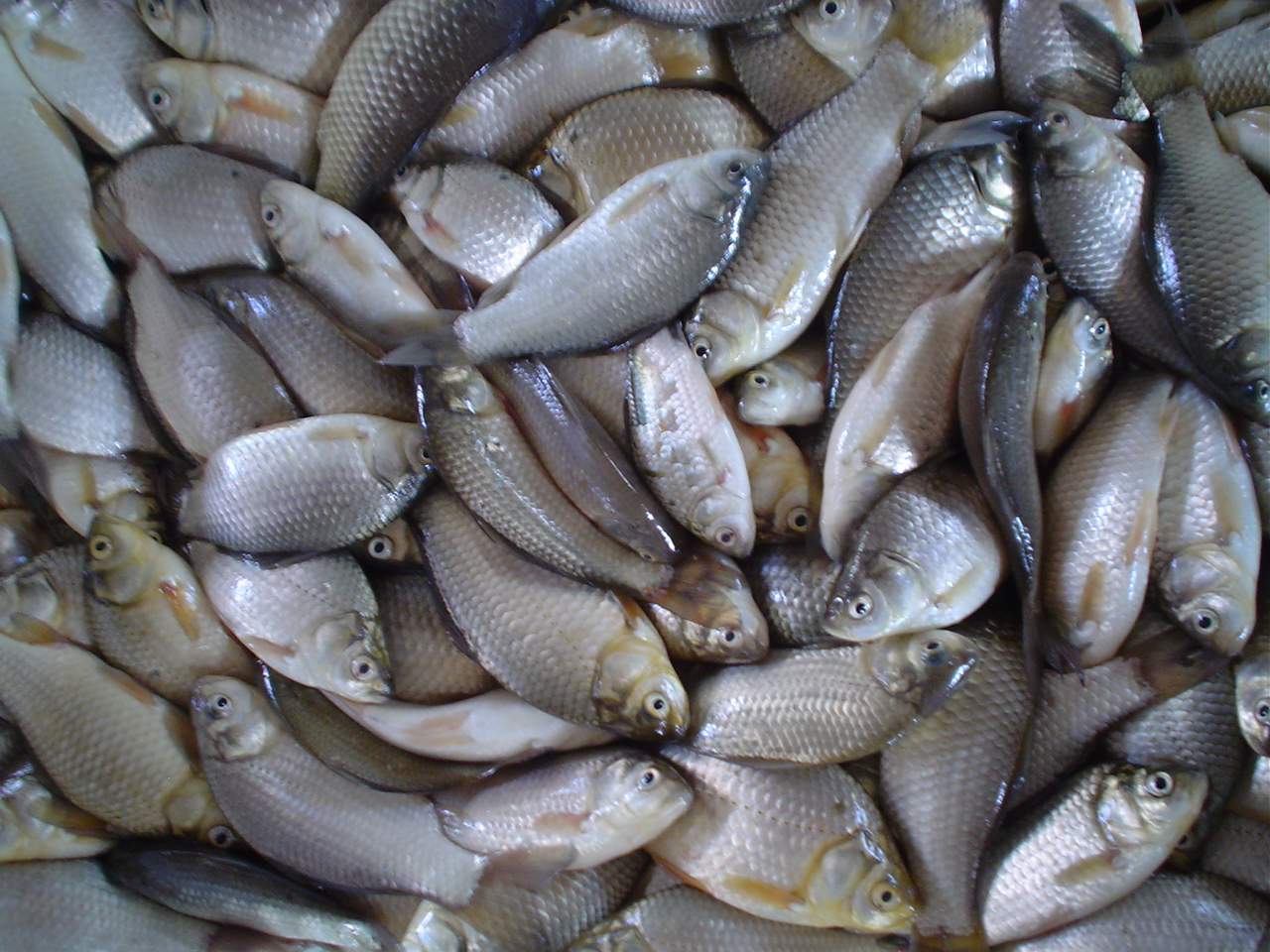
Fresh crucian carp

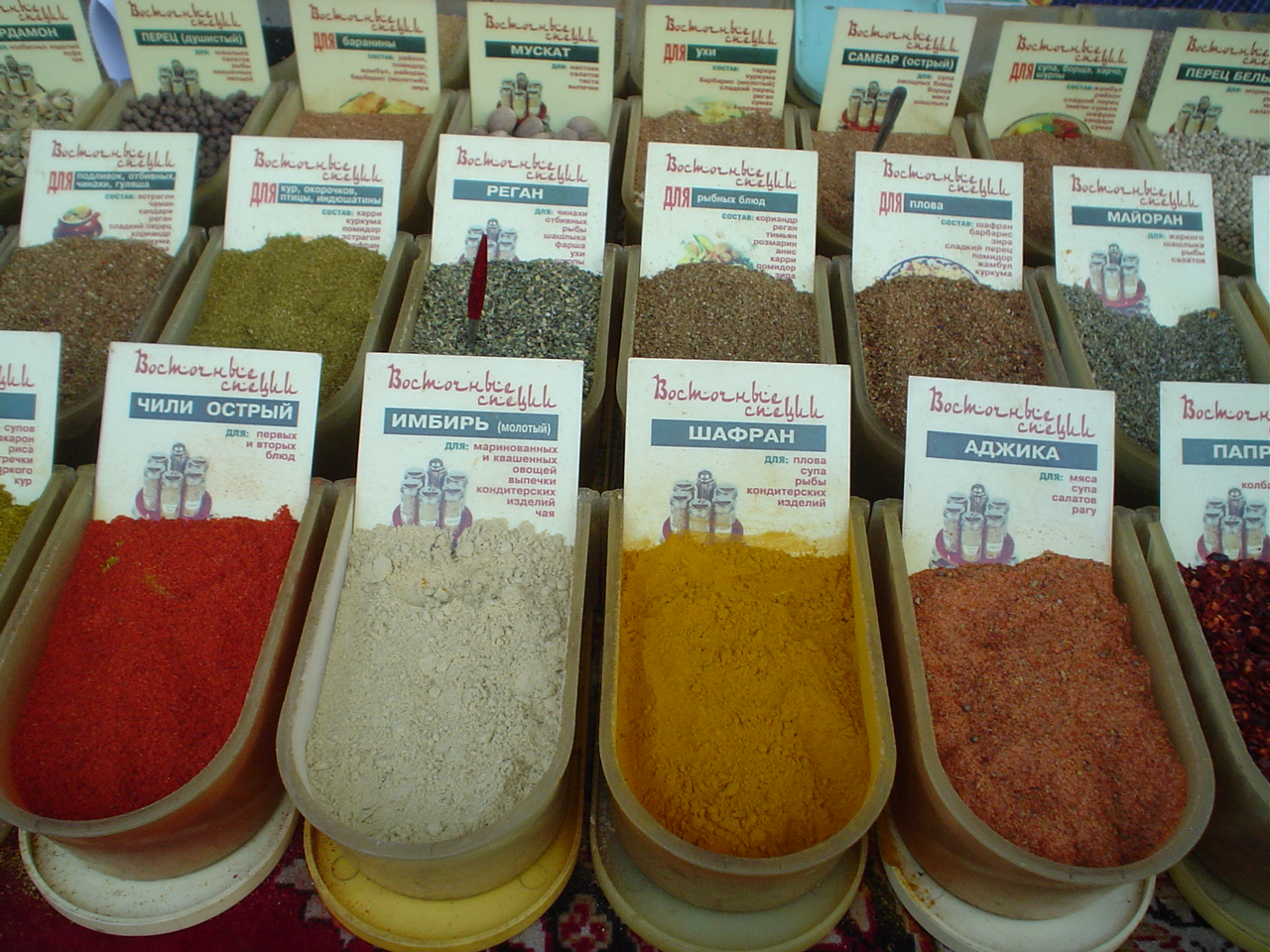
Spices

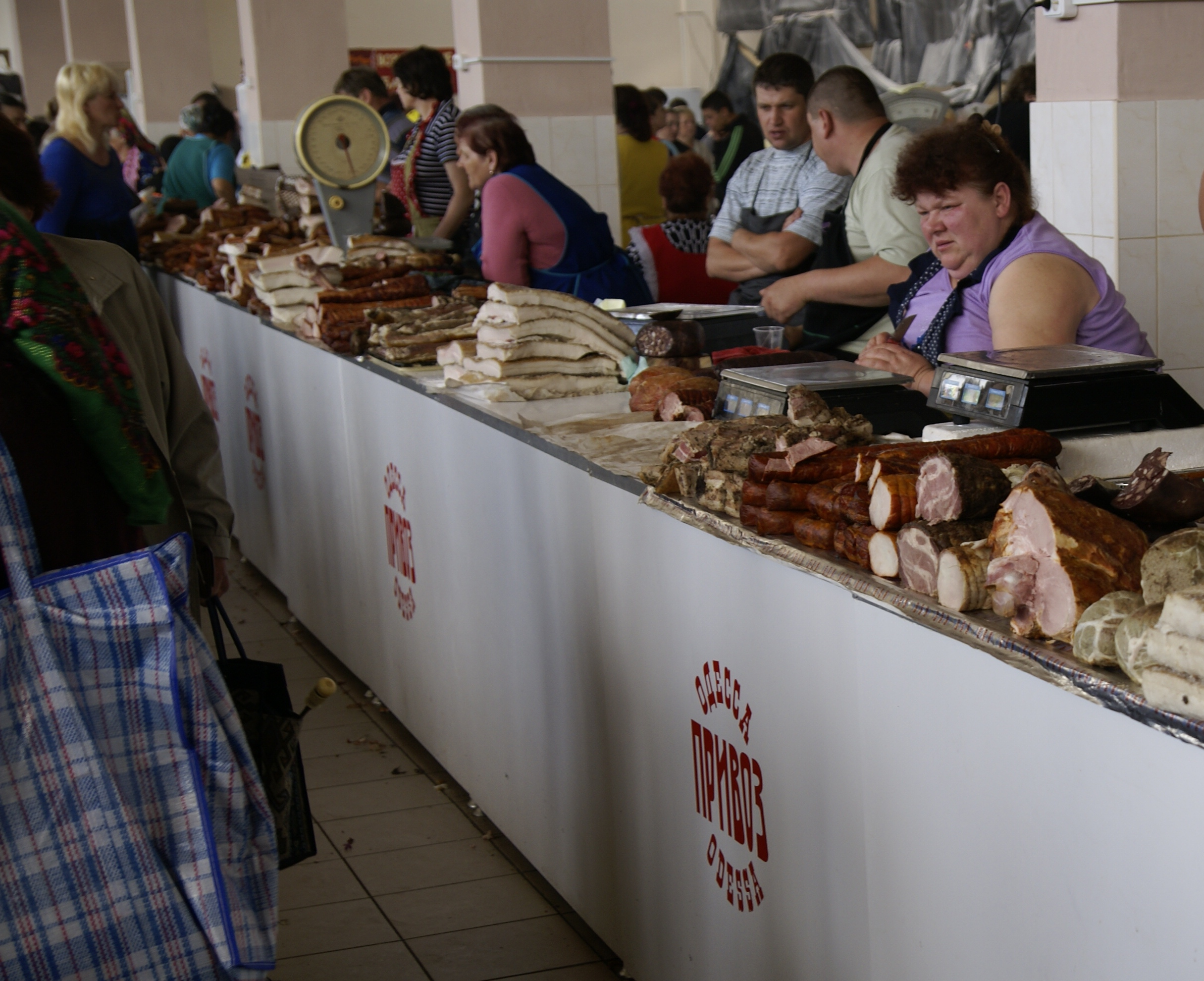
Meat and dairy row

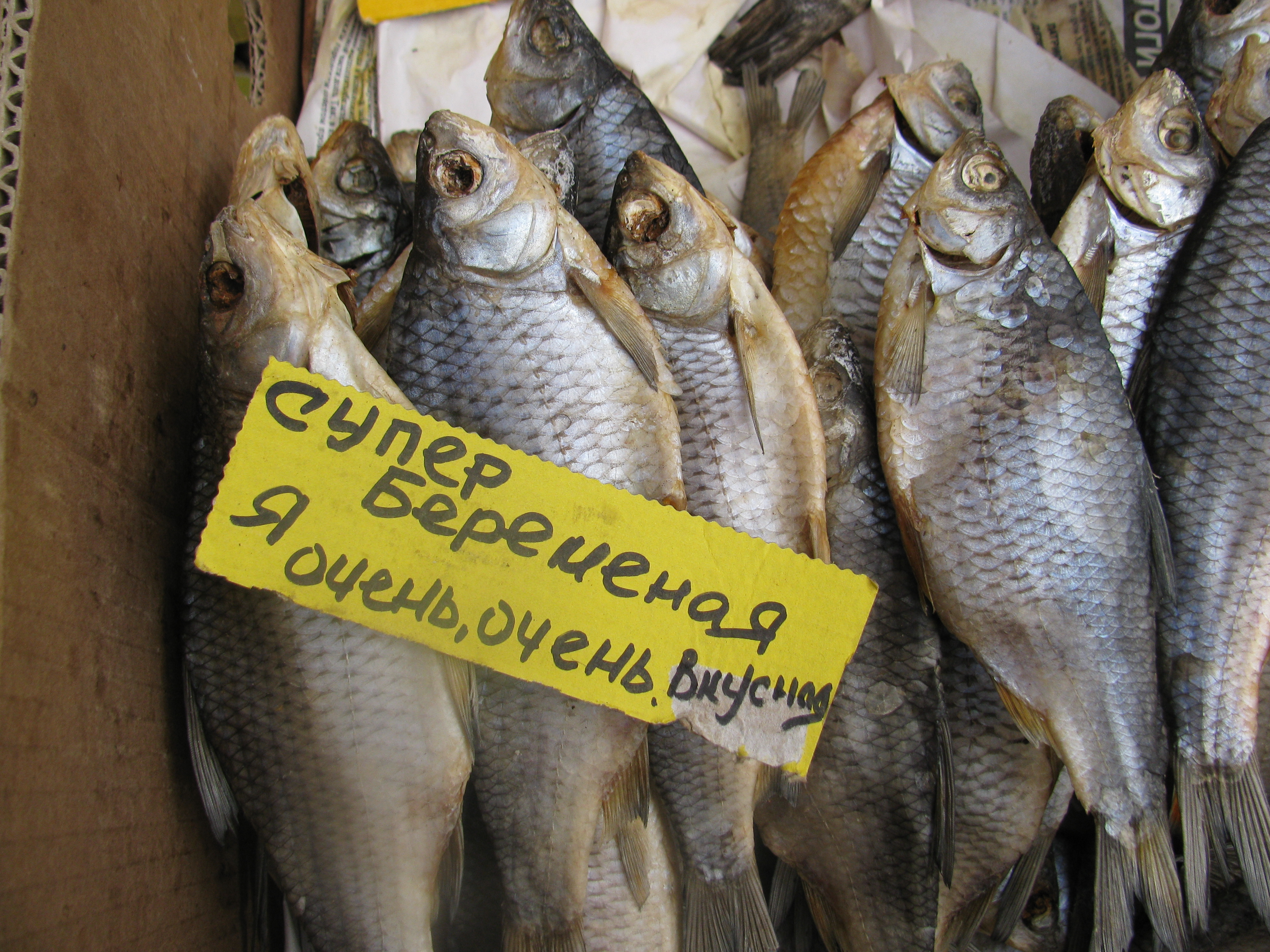
Dried fish

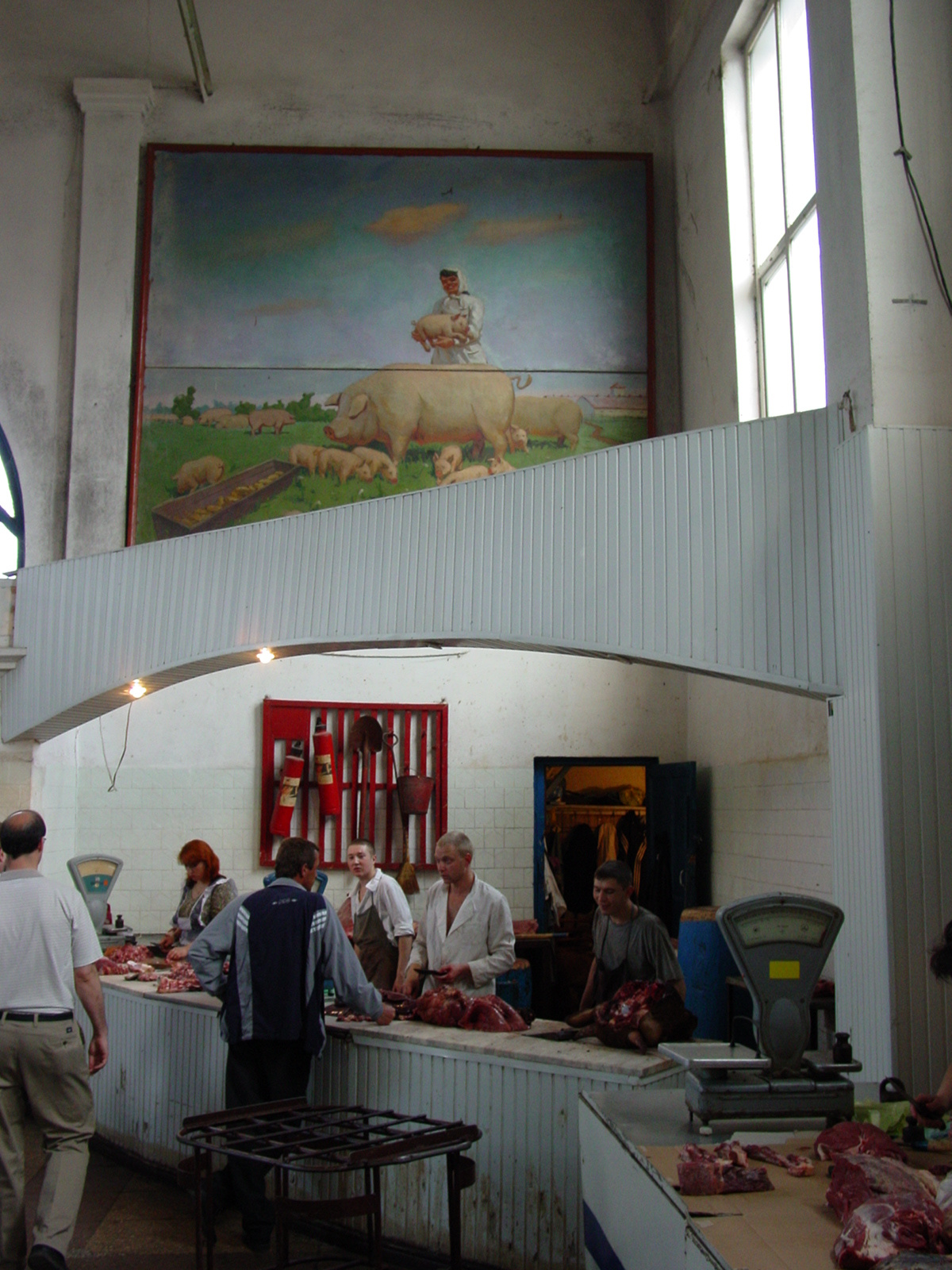
Meat section

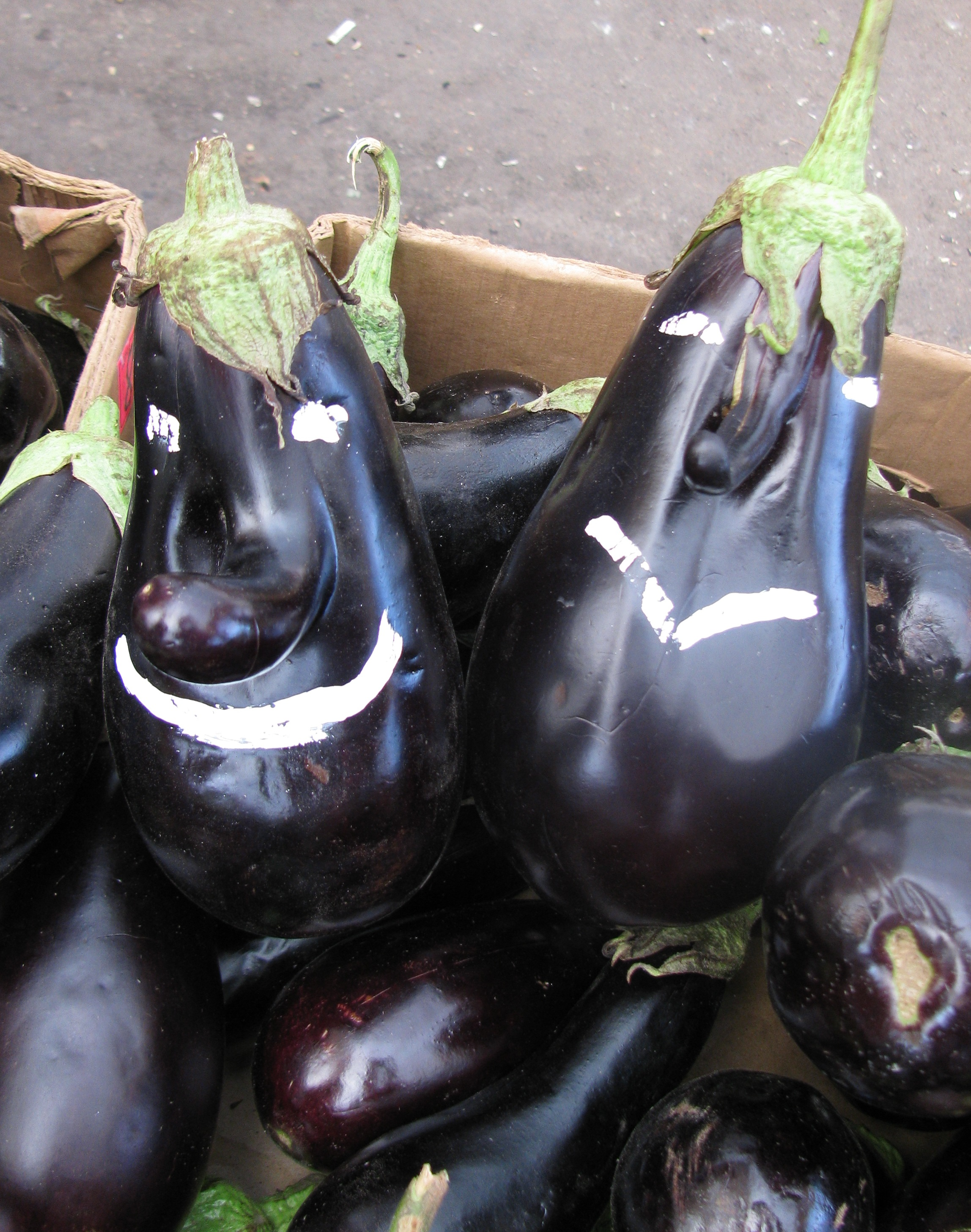
Eggplants

== See also ==
- Seventh-Kilometer Market, another market in Odesa
- Zhytniy Market, indoor market in Kyiv
- Bessarabskyi Market, bazaar in Kyiv
