= Khlibodarske =

Rural locality in Odesa Oblast, Ukraine

Khlibodarske Хлібодарське
- Rural settlement
- Location within Odesa Oblast Location within Ukraine
- Coordinates: 46°29′04″N 30°35′40″E
- Country: Ukraine
- Oblast: Odesa Oblast
- Raion: Odesa Raion
- Hromada: Avanhard settlement hromada

Population (2022)
  - Total: 2,555
- Time zone: UTC+2 (EET)
  - Summer (DST): UTC+3 (EEST)

Khlibodarske (Ukrainian: Хлібодарське; Russian: Хлебодарское) is a rural settlement in Odesa Raion, Odesa Oblast, Ukraine. It is essentially a western suburb of the city of Odesa. Khlibodarske belongs to Avanhard settlement hromada, one of the hromadas of Ukraine. Population: 2,555 (2022 estimate).

== History ==
Until 18 July 2020, Khlibodarske belonged to Biliaivka Raion. The raion was abolished in July 2020 as part of the administrative reform of Ukraine, which reduced the number of raions of Odesa Oblast to seven. The area of Biliaivka Raion was merged into Odesa Raion.

Until 26 January 2024, Khlibodarske was designated urban-type settlement. On this day, a new law entered into force which abolished this status, and Khlibodarske became a rural settlement.

== Economy ==
=== Transportation ===
The closest railway station, located in Odesa, is Novodepovska. It is on the railway line which connects Odesa via Rozdilna and Podilsk with Vinnytsia. There is some passenger traffic.

The settlement is included into Odesa road network. In particular, it lies between M15 and M16, which connect Odesa with Reni via Izmail and with Moldovan border at Kuchurhan, respectively.
