= Avanhard, Odesa Oblast =

Rural settlement in Odesa Oblast, Ukraine

Avanhard Авангард
- Rural settlement
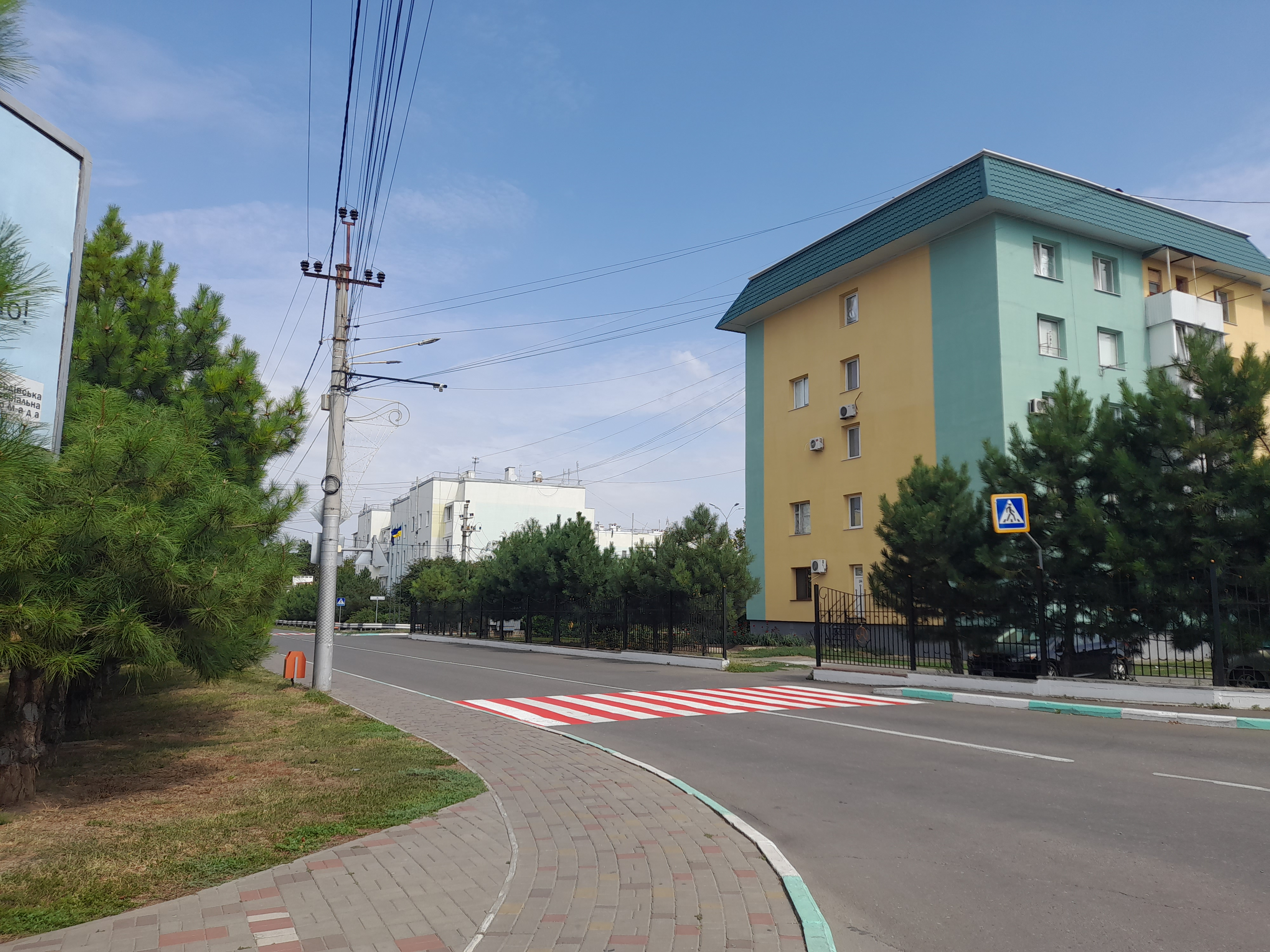

- Location within Odesa Oblast Location within Ukraine
- Coordinates: 46°28′17″N 30°36′54″E
- Country: Ukraine
- Oblast: Odesa Oblast
- Raion: Odesa Raion
- Hromada: Avanhard settlement hromada

Population (2022)
  - Total: 7,435
- Time zone: UTC+2 (EET)
  - Summer (DST): UTC+3 (EEST)

Avanhard (Ukrainian: Авангард, IPA: [ɐʋɐnˈɦard]; Russian: Авангард, IPA: [ɐvɐnˈɡart]) is a rural settlement in Odesa Raion, Odesa Oblast, Ukraine. It is a western suburb of the city of Odesa and is adjacent to the city. Avanhard hosts the administration of Avanhard settlement hromada, one of the hromadas of Ukraine. Population: 7,435 (2022 estimate).

== History ==
Until 18 July 2020, Avanhard belonged to Ovidiopol Raion. The raion was abolished in July 2020 as part of the administrative reform of Ukraine, which reduced the number of raions of Odesa Oblast to seven. The area of Ovidiopol Raion was split between Bilhorod-Dnistrovskyi and Odesa Raions, with Avanhard being transferred to Odesa Raion.

Until 26 January 2024, Avanhard was designated urban-type settlement. On this day, a new law entered into force which abolished this status, and Avanhard became a rural settlement.

== Economy ==
The sprawling Seventh-Kilometer Market is located within the settlement near freight station Odesa-Zakhidna ^{(uk)}.

=== Transportation ===
The closest railway station, located in Odesa, is Novodepovska. It is on the railway line which connects Odesa via Rozdilna and Podilsk with Vinnytsia. There is some passenger traffic.

The settlement is included into the Odesa road network.
