= Tairove =

Rural locality in Odesa Oblast, Ukraine

Tairove Таїрове
- Rural settlement
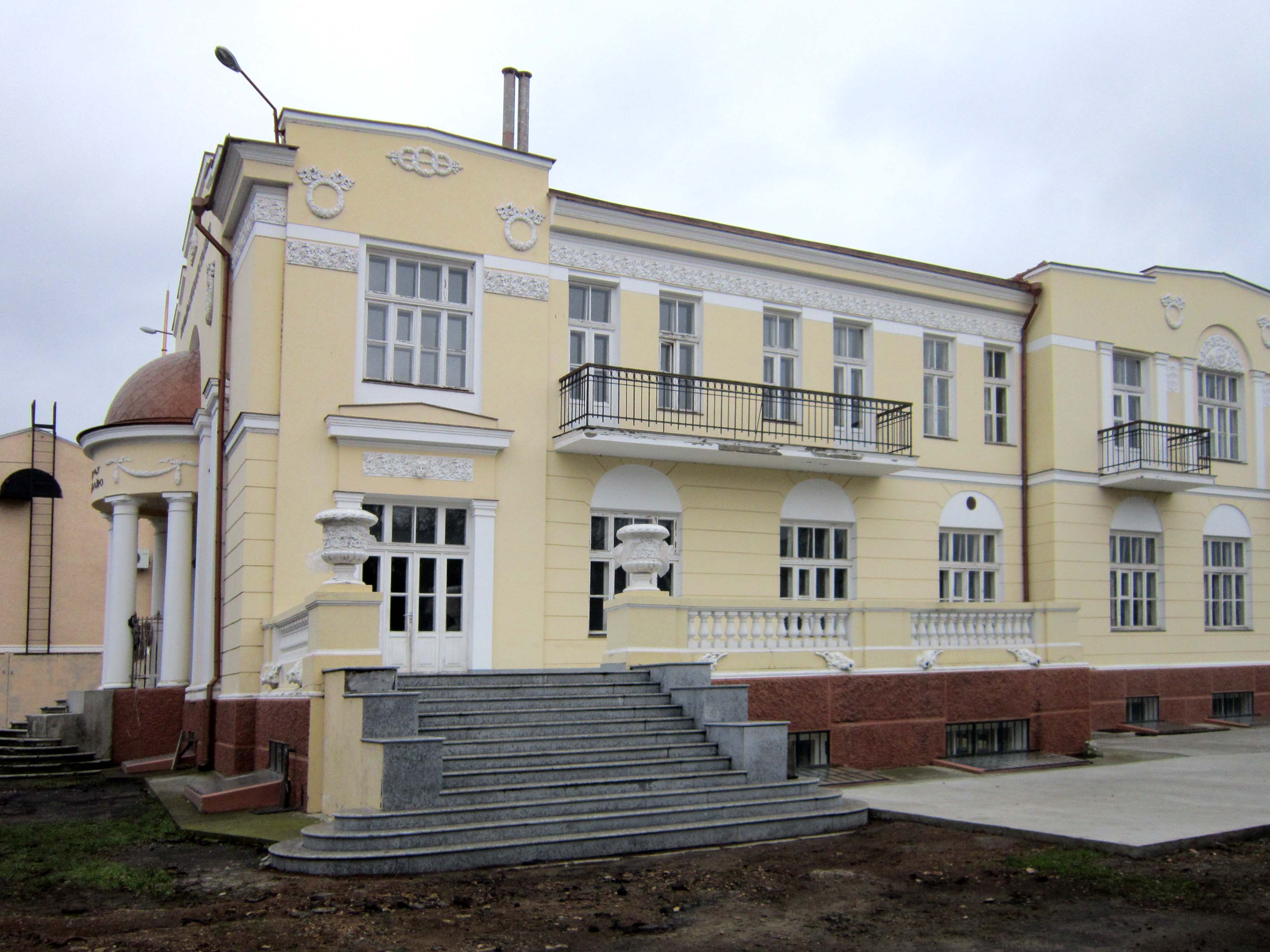

- Location in Ukraine Tairove (Ukraine)
- Coordinates: 46°21′54″N 30°38′48″E
- Country: Ukraine
- Oblast: Odesa Oblast
- Raion: Odesa Raion
- Hromada: Tairove settlement hromada
- Founded: 198? (Tairove); 1982 (Instytut of Tairov)

Area
  - Total: 1.5 km^{2} (0.58 sq mi)

Population (2022)
  - Total: 3,981
  - Density: 2,700/km^{2} (6,900/sq mi)
- Time zone: UTC+2 (EET)
  - Summer (DST): UTC+3 (EEST)
- Postal code: 65496
- Area code: +380 48

Tairove (Ukrainian: Таїрове) is a rural settlement in Odesa Raion, Odesa Oblast (region) of southern Ukraine. It hosts the administration of Tairove settlement hromada, one of the hromadas of Ukraine. Population: 3,981 (2022 estimate)

== History ==
Until 18 July 2020, Tairove belonged to Ovidiopol Raion. The raion was abolished in July 2020 as part of the administrative reform of Ukraine, which reduced the number of raions of Odesa Oblast to seven. The area of Ovidiopol Raion was split between Odesa and Bilhorod-Dnistrovskyi Raions, with Tairove being transferred to Odesa Raion.

Until 26 January 2024, Tairove was designated urban-type settlement. On this day, a new law entered into force which abolished this status, and Tairove became a rural settlement.
