= Ovidiopol settlement hromada =

Coordinates: 46°16′N 30°26′E

Ovidiopol settlement hromada Овідіопольська селищна громада
- Hromada
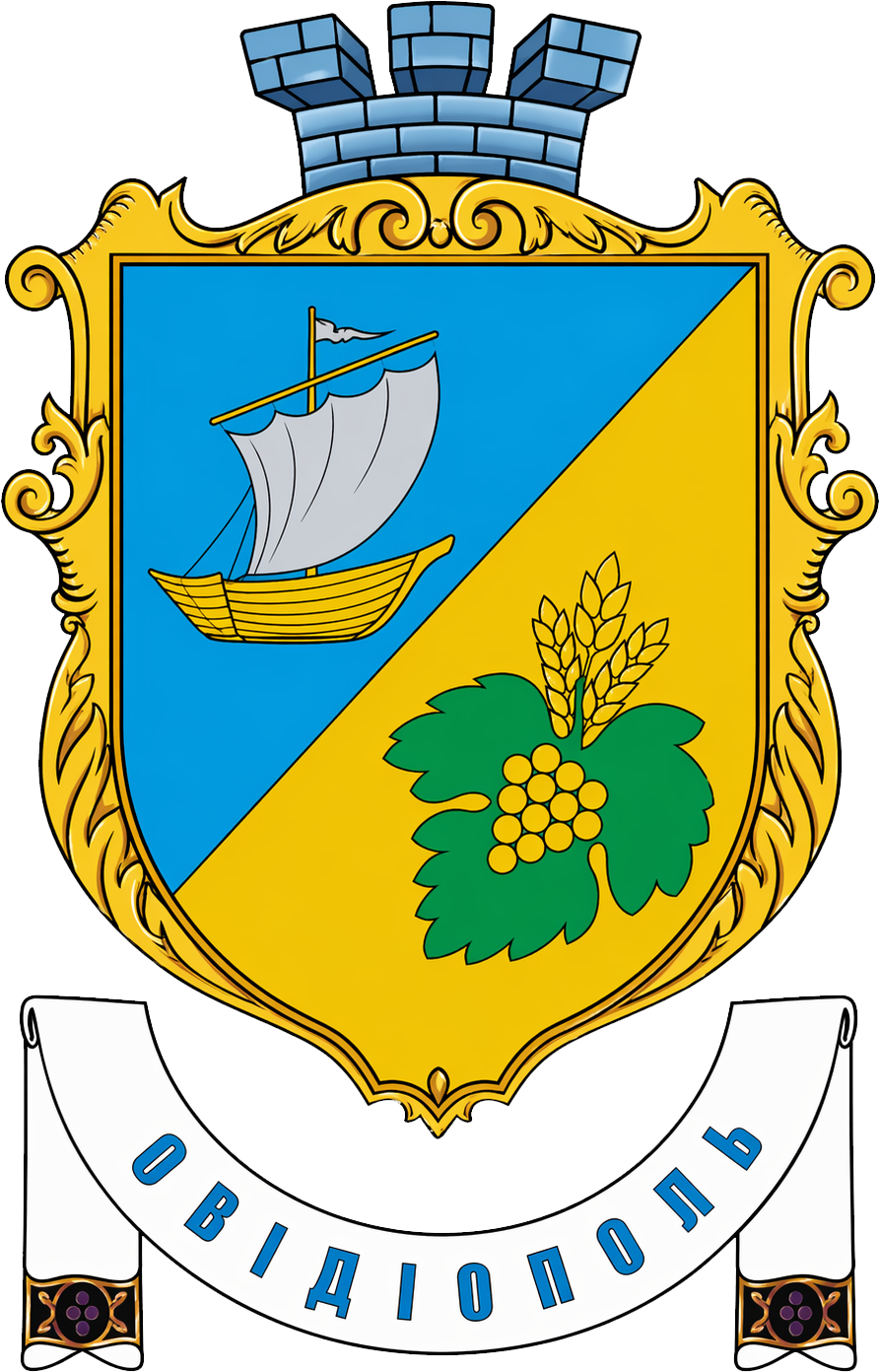
- Coat of arms
- Interactive map of Ovidiopol settlement hromada
- Country: Ukraine
- Oblast: Odesa Oblast
- Raion: Odesa Raion
- Admin. center: Ovidiopol

Area
  - Total: 231.5 km^{2} (89.4 sq mi)

Population (2020)
  - Total: 15,477
  - Density: 66.86/km^{2} (173.2/sq mi)
- CATOTTG code: UA51100250000055079
- Settlements: 3
- Rural settlements: 1
- Villages: 2

Ovidiopol settlement hromada (Ukrainian: Овідіопольська селищна громада) is a hromada in Odesa Raion of Odesa Oblast in southwestern Ukraine. Population: 15,477 (2020 est.)

The hromada consists of a rural settlement (Ovidiopol) and 2 villages: Kalahliya and Mykolaivka

== Links ==
- https://decentralization.gov.ua/newgromada/4359#
- картка Постанови ВР
