= Ovidiopol =

Rural settlement in Odesa Oblast, Ukraine

Ovidiopol Ові́діополь
- Rural settlement
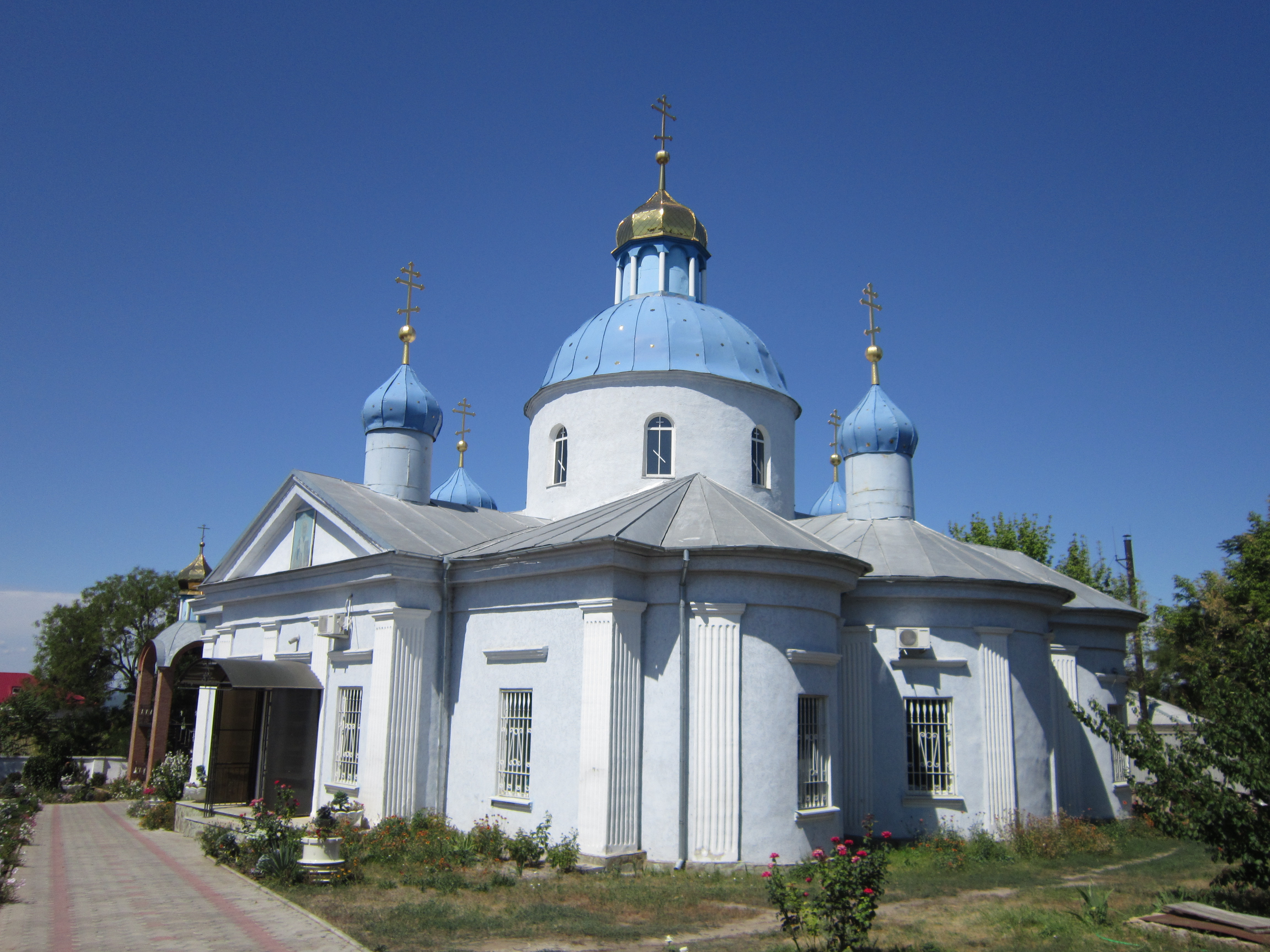
- Church of Saint Mykola, the Miracleworker

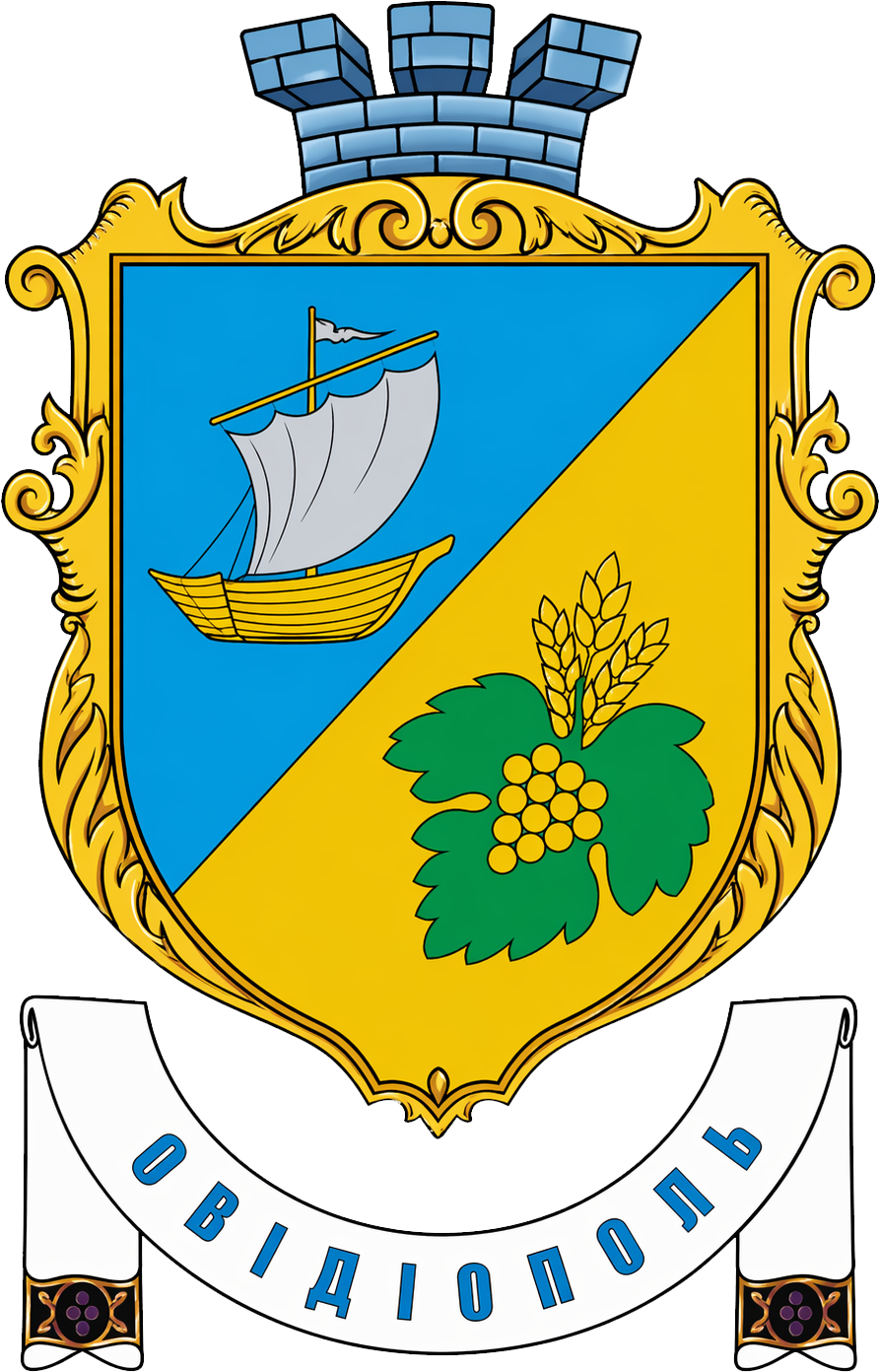
- Coat of arms
- Interactive map of Ovidiopol
- Location of Ovidiopol Ovidiopol (Odesa Oblast)
- Coordinates: 46°14′41″N 30°26′41″E
- Country: Ukraine
- Oblast: Odesa Oblast
- Raion: Odesa Raion
- Hromada: Ovidiopol settlement hromada
- First mentioned: 17th century

Area
  - Total: 12.52 km^{2} (4.83 sq mi)
- Elevation: 16 m (52 ft)

Population (2022)
  - Total: 11,407
  - Density: 911.1/km^{2} (2,360/sq mi)
- Time zone: UTC+2 (EET)
  - Summer (DST): UTC+3 (EEST)
- Postal code: 67800—805
- Area code: +380 4851

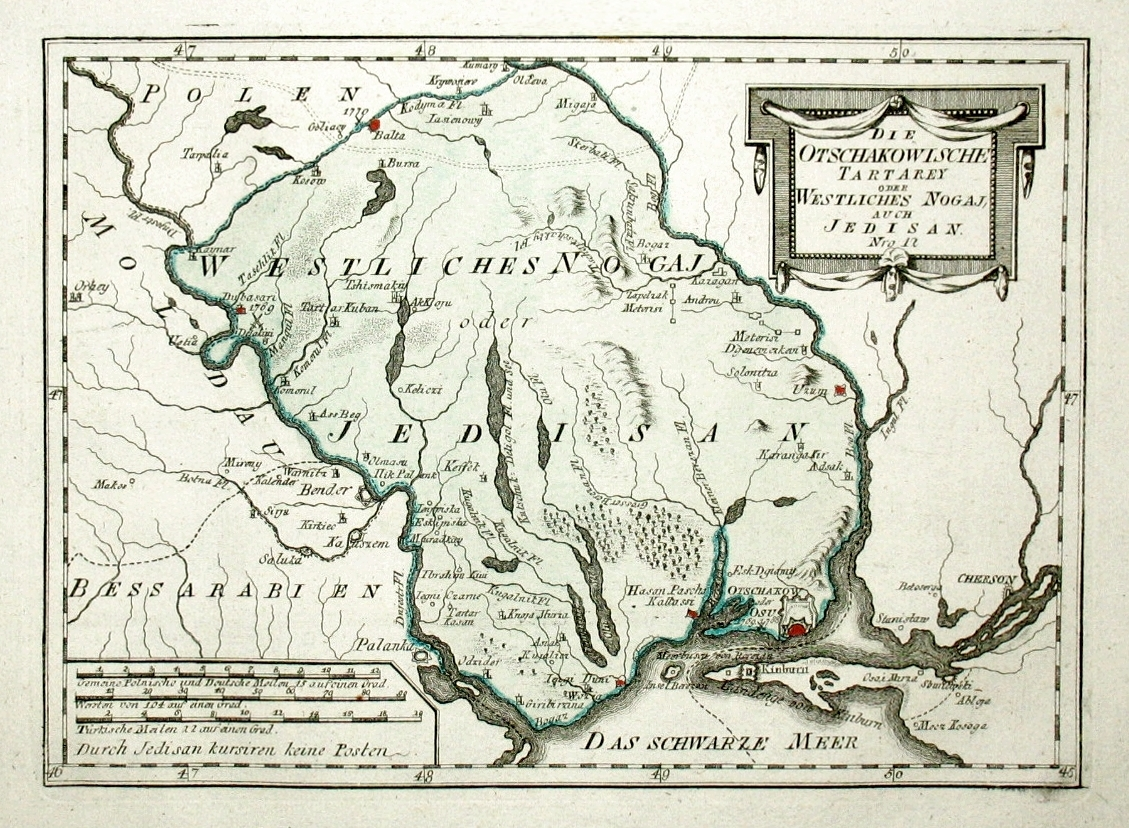
Odzider on Dniester on the German map of Ochakiv Tartary

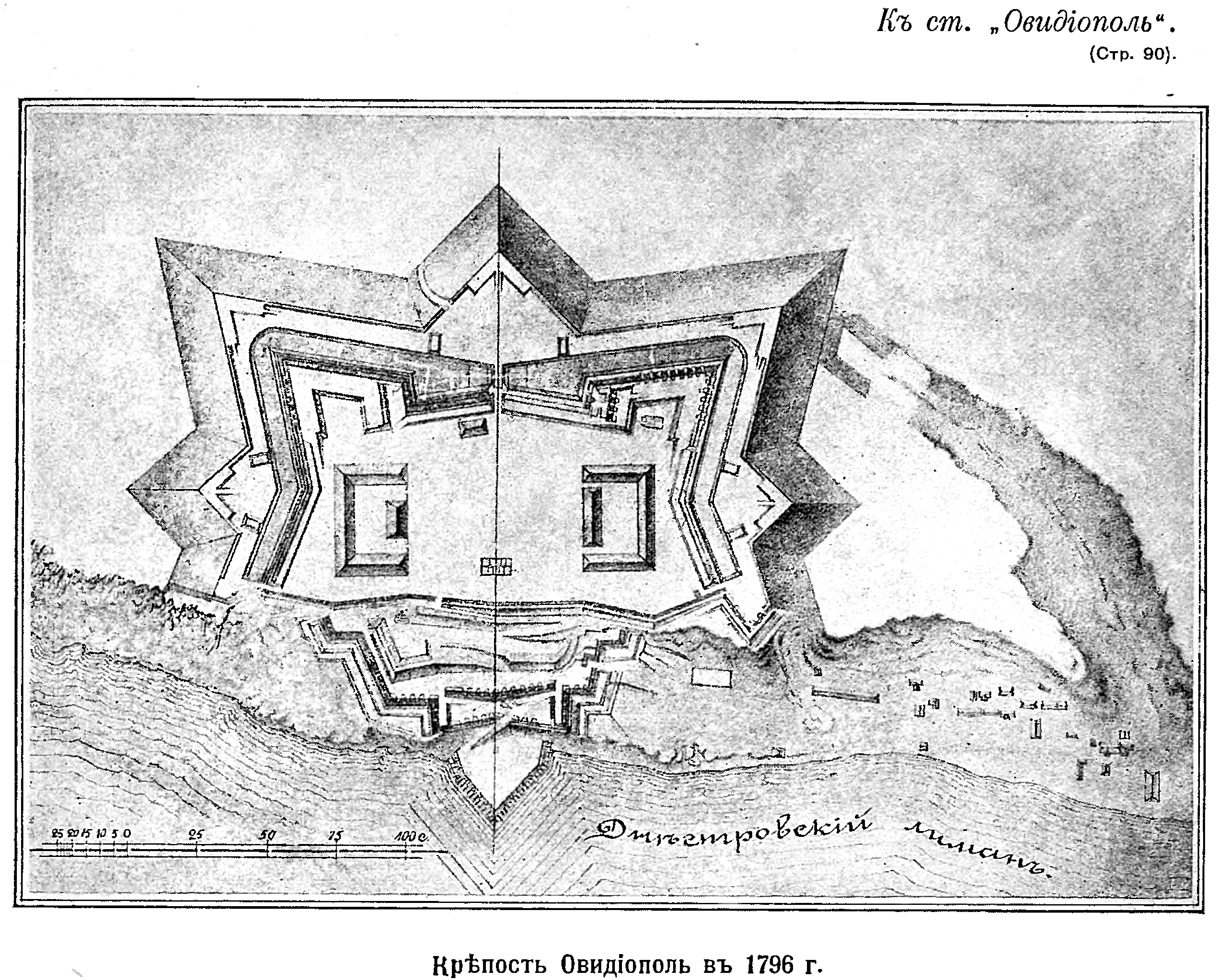
Fortress Ovidiopol in 1796

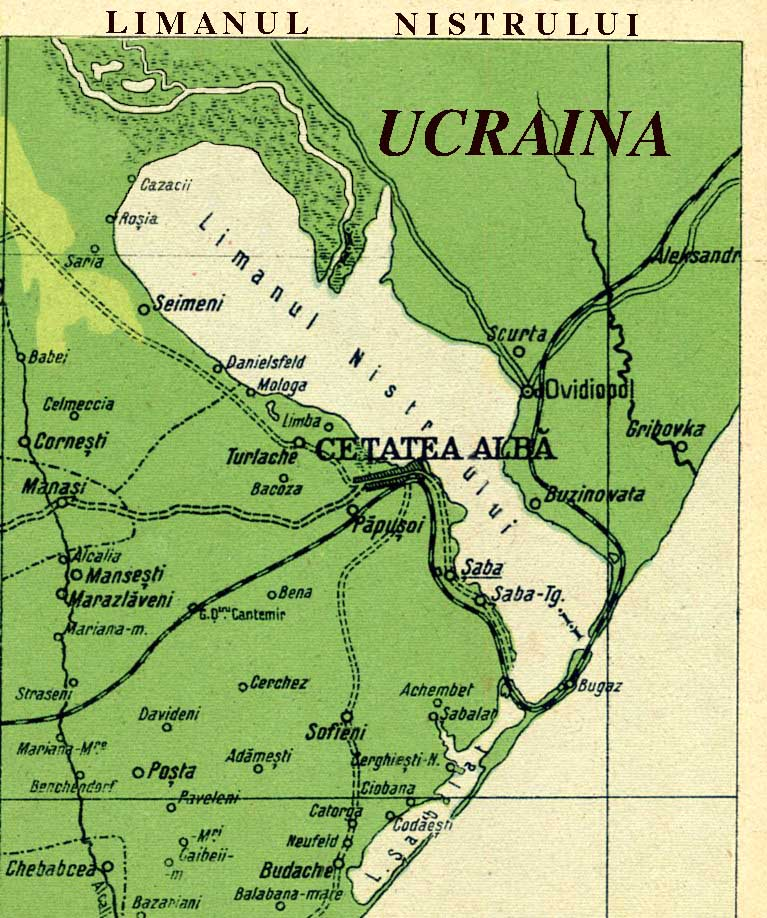
Dniester Estuary and its vicinities

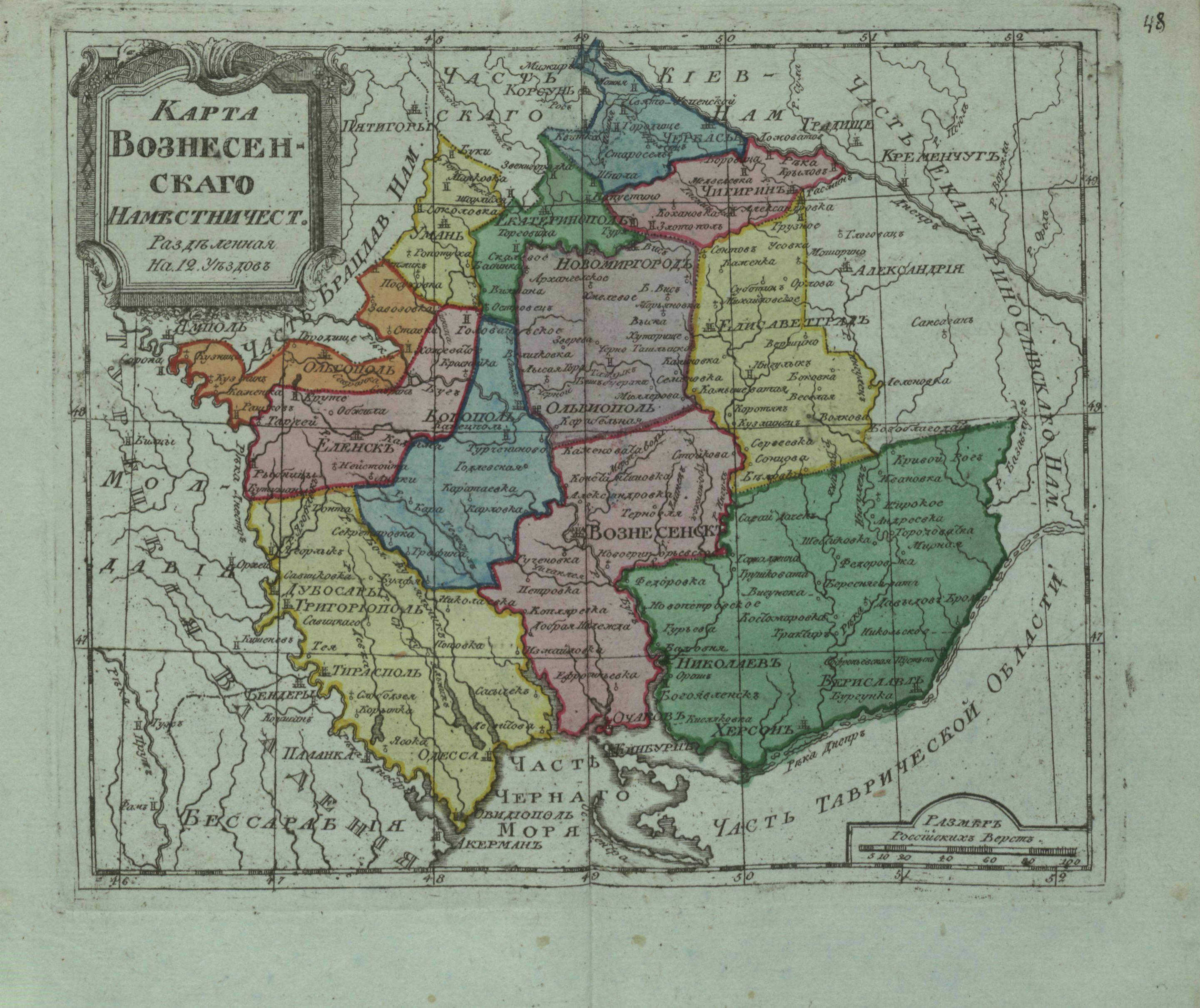
1796 map of Voznesensk Namestnichestvo

Ovidiopol (Ukrainian: Ові́діополь; Russian: Овидиополь; Turkish: Hacıdere) is a coastal rural settlement in Odesa Oblast, Ukraine. It is located on the eastern bank of Dniester Estuary directly across Bilhorod-Dnistrovskyi and 40 km (25 mi) west of Odesa. Ovidiopol hosts the administration of Ovidiopol settlement hromada, one of the hromadas of Ukraine. Population: 11,407 (2022 estimate).

== History ==
The place is first mentioned as early as 17th century. Hacıdere belonged to Akkerman sanjak of Silistra Eyalet, or Kefe Eyalet where Akkerman sanjak was actually located. At Medieval times Akkerman, at that time known as Maurocastrum, was a trade port of Byzantine and later Genoese colonies out of the Southern coast of Crimea. In mid 18th century Hacıdere was a big populated place with a pier through which was conducted a grain trade. During the 1768–1774 Russo-Turkish War, in 1769 Hacıdere was burned down by Zaporizhian Cossacks led by Petro Kalnyshevskyi. About twenty years later in 1789 (during the 1787–1792 Russo-Turkish War) the revived town was stormed and captured by the Russian troops and by the 1791 Treaty of Jassy was transferred under the Russian administration. Just before it was captured by Russians, the French military engineer André-Joseph Lafitte-Clavé who visited the area in late 18th century (1787) described that it took them around an hour to swim on a raft from Akkerman to Adzhider. Lafitte-Clavé noted that depth in Dniester in the area is around 10 ft (3.0 m).

The Adzhider (a Russian adaptation) fortress was built sometime around 1793 (end of 1792) soon after end of the 1787–1792 Russo-Turkish War and was among the three key fortresses in the area along with Hacibey fortress in Odesa and Middle fortress in Tiraspol. The fortress had a specially built harbor and was intended to stand against the Ottoman Akkerman Fortress on the other side of the Dniester Estuary (liman). The location for the fortress was picked by the Russian field marshal Alexander Suvorov. Construction of fortress was conducting by engineer captain Rester as a star fort on design of Flemish military engineer François Sainte de Wollant. The official date of laying the first stone in the fortress is 15 June 1793. It was this date that in the Russian and the Soviet historiography was considered as the date of foundation. In 1795 the Russian Empress Catherine the Great by hers decree officially renamed the newly built fortress as Ovidiopol. The fortress was built to protect entrance to Dniester from the Black Sea, cease Turkish attacks on Mykolaiv and Ochakiv and to serve as an intermediate storage of goods between Odesa and Dniester.

The noble Cossack family of Skarzhinsky had real estate investments in Ovidiopol during this time.

The town was named in 1795 after Ovid, the Roman poet exiled to the Black Sea coast, based on the claim of Dimitrie Cantemir in his Descriptio Moldaviae (1714–1716) that a local lake near Bilhorod-Dnistrovskyi (probably the Dniester Liman itself, on whose eastern shore the town is located) was named in Romanian Lacul Ovidului (Ovid's Lake). In reality Ovid stayed in Tomis (today Romanian Constanta).

With the establishment of the fortress, around it appeared a settlement that in 1795 accounted for 266 people and was part of Tiraspol okrug (district) in Voznesensk Namestnichestvo (vice-royalty). Ovidiopol was granted status of a supernumerary town ("zashtatny gorod"). In December of 1796 Voznesensk Namestnichestvo was liquidated and the territory became part of Novorossiya Governorate. In the beginning of 19th century Novorossiya Governorate was liquidated and Ovidiopol existed with Kherson Governorate until the end of World War I and the Russian Civil War. In 1920-1925 Ovidiopol was in Odesa Governorate.

Until 18 July 2020, Ovidiopol was the administrative center of Ovidiopol Raion. The raion was abolished in July 2020 as part of the administrative reform of Ukraine, which reduced the number of raions of Odesa Oblast to seven. The area of Ovidiopol Raion was split between Odesa and Bilhorod-Dnistrovskyi Raions, with Ovidiopol being transferred to Odesa Raion.

Until 26 January 2024, Ovidiopol was designated urban-type settlement. On this day, a new law entered into force which abolished this status, and Ovidiopol became a rural settlement.

== Demographics ==
As of Ukraine's national census in 2001, Ovidiopol had a population of 11,818 inhabitants. Most of the population is Ukrainophone, yet a significant Russian-speaking community also exists in the town, as well as a smaller number of linguistic minorities. The exact linguistic composition of the settlement was as follows:

Native languages in Ovidiopol
	percent
Ukrainian	83.2%
Russian	14.6%
Armenian	0.8%
Bulgarian	0.7%
Moldovan	0.4%
Belarusian	0.1%
others	0.2%

== International relations ==
=== Twin towns — Sister cities ===
Ovidiopol is twinned with:

- Gniew, Poland
- Vrchlabí, Czech Republic

== Gallery ==
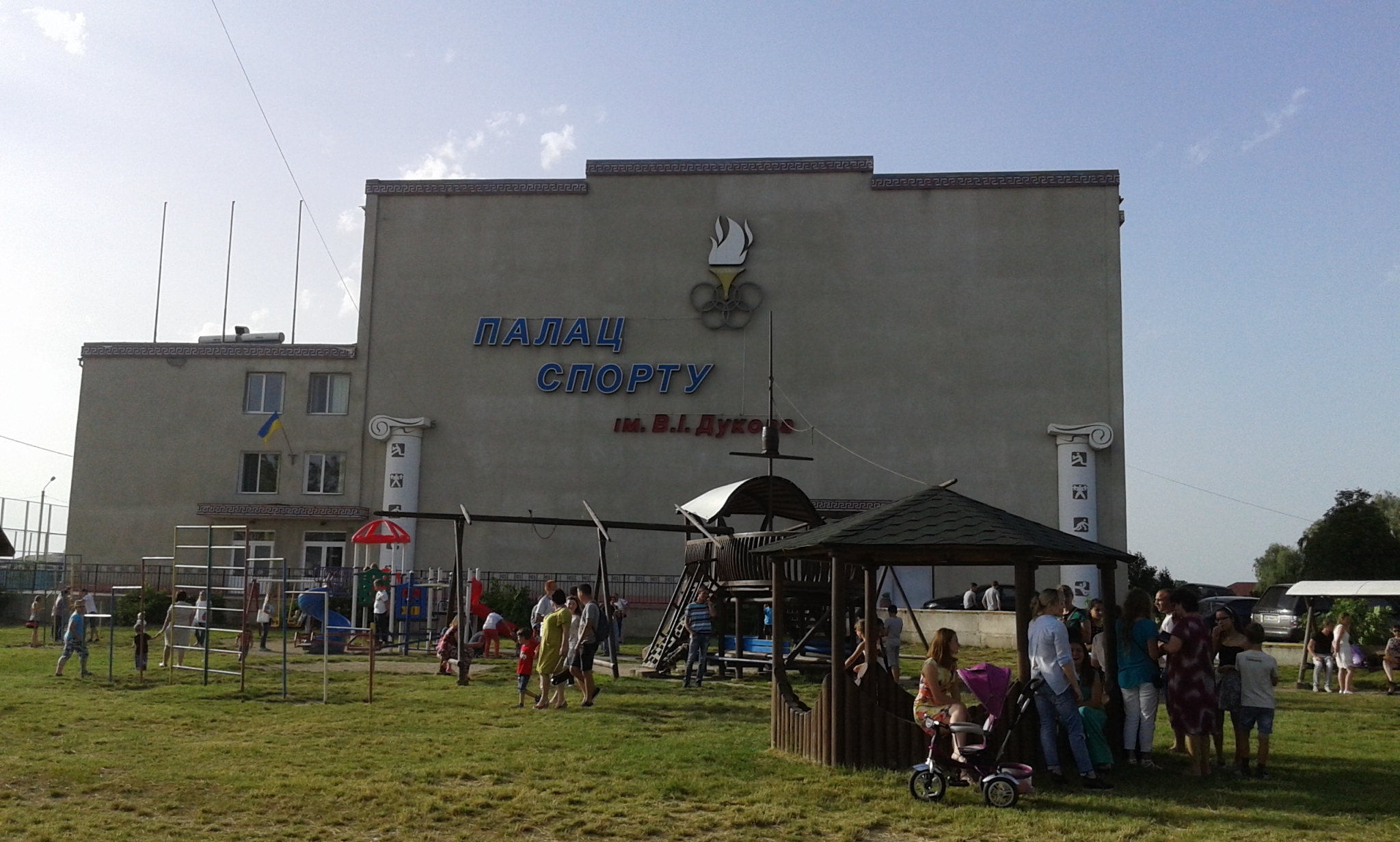
Palace of sports (community gymnasium)
