= Dalnyk =

Coordinates: 46°28′24.5″N 30°33′42.2″E

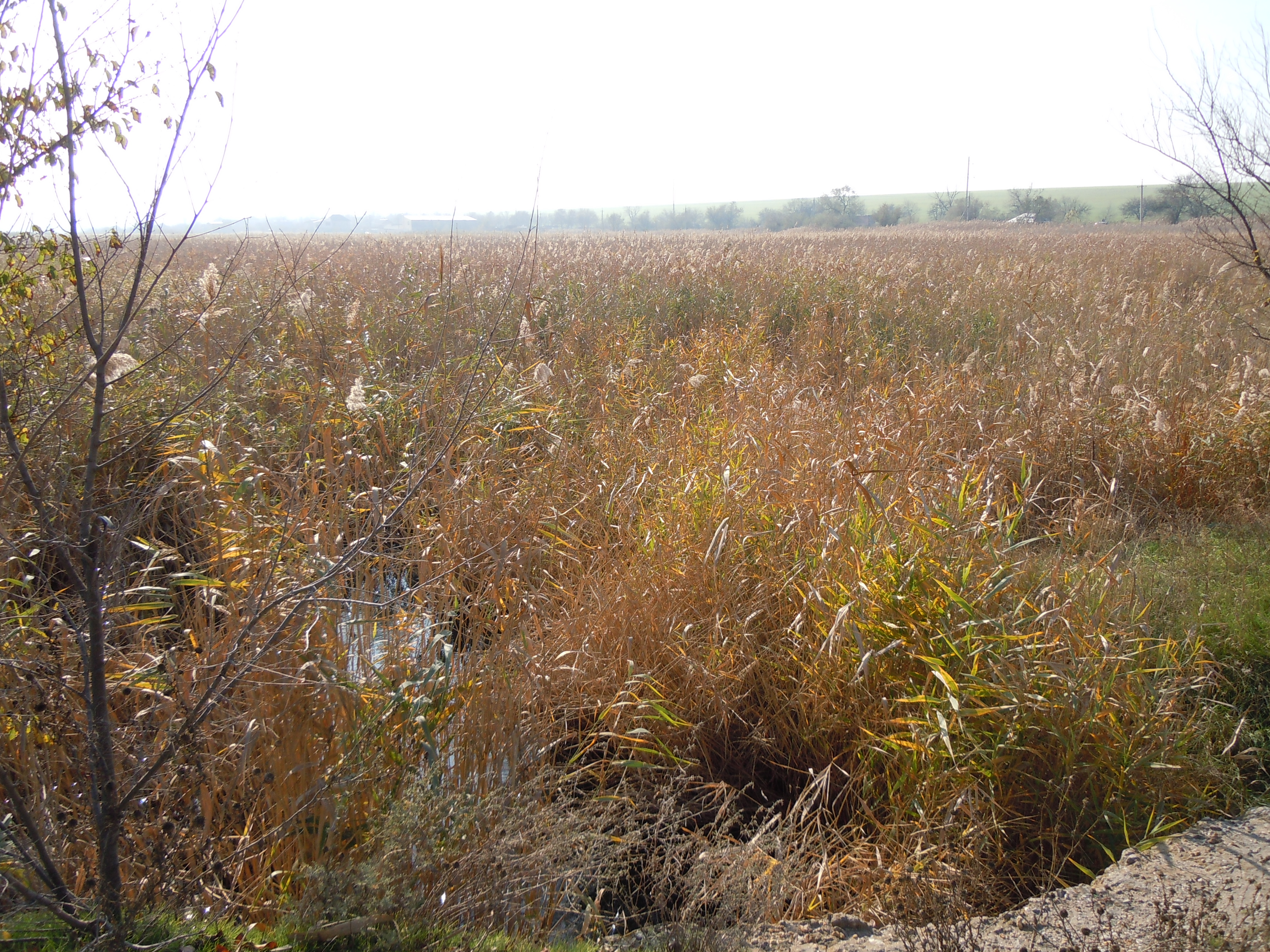
- Dalnyk River between the villages Nova Dolyna and Prylymanske

Location
- Country: Ukraine

Physical characteristics
- Source
  - location: near the village of Dachne
- Mouth
  - location: Sukhyi Estuary
- Length: 18 kilometres (11 mi)
- Basin size: 175 square kilometres (68 sq mi)

The Dalnyk (Ukrainian: Дальник) is a small steppe river in Odesa Raion, Odesa Oblast, Ukraine. The river has its origin near the village Dachne and flows into the Sukhyi Estuary near the village Nova Dolyna, making a series of freshwater ponds. The village of Velykyi Dalnyk is located on the banks of the river.

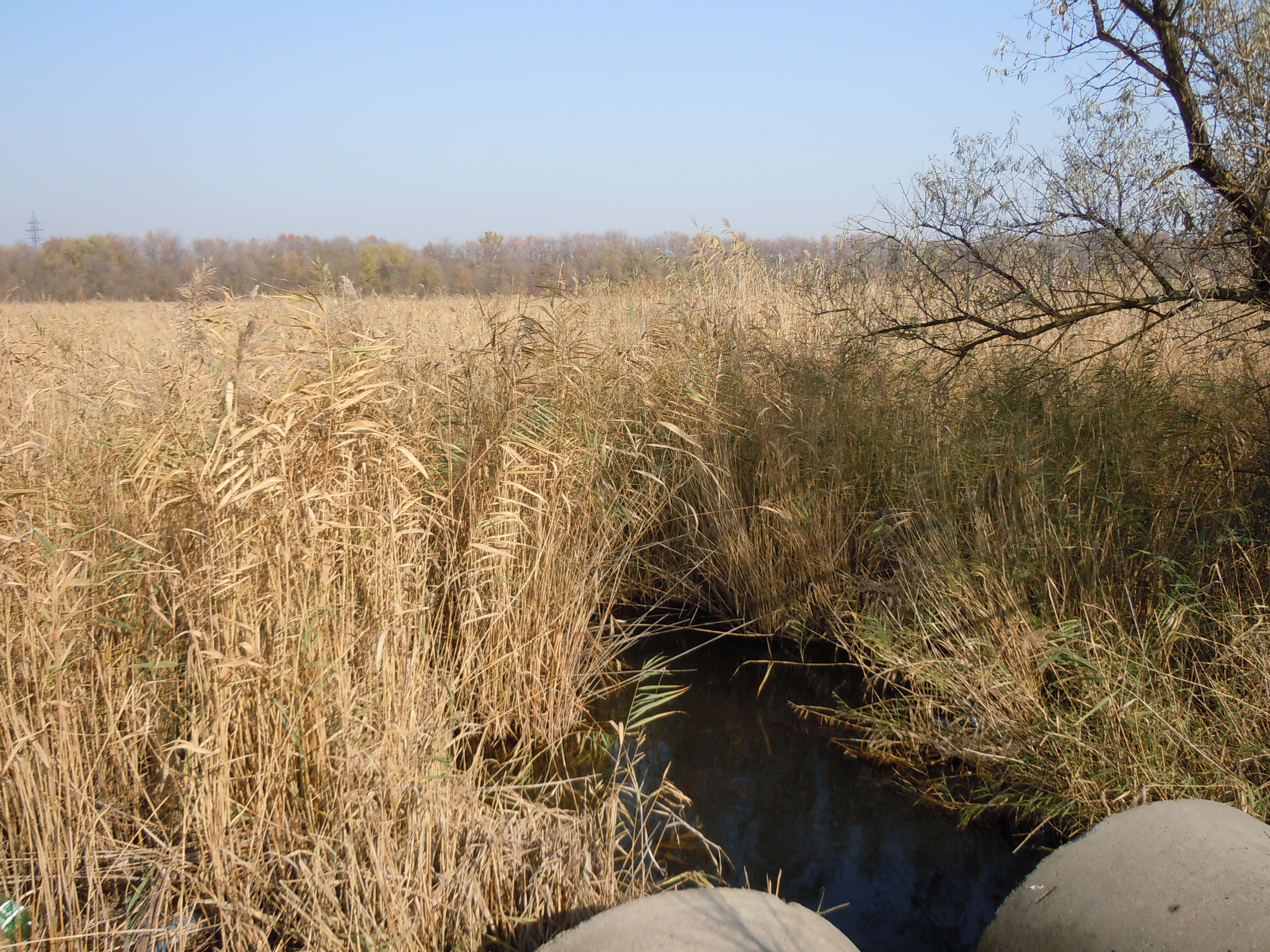
Dalnyk River inflows to the Sukhyi Estuary
