= Avanhard settlement hromada =

Coordinates: 46°28′N 30°36′E

Avanhard settlement hromada Авангардівська селищна громада
- Hromada
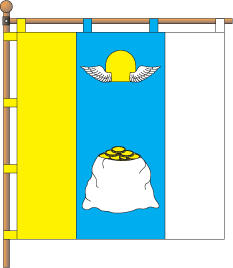
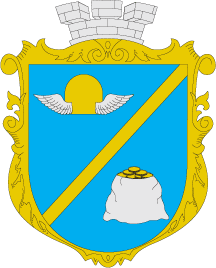
- Flag Coat of arms
- Interactive map of Avanhard settlement hromada
- Country: Ukraine
- Oblast: Odesa Oblast
- Raion: Odesa Raion
- Admin. center: Avanhard

Area
  - Total: 73.87 km^{2} (28.52 sq mi)

Population (2023)
  - Total: 20,505
  - Density: 277.6/km^{2} (718.9/sq mi)
- CATOTTG code: UA51100010000023950
- Settlements: 5
- Rural settlements: 3
- Villages: 2

Avanhard settlement hromada (Ukrainian: Авангардівська селищна громада) is a hromada in Odesa Raion of Odesa Oblast in southwestern Ukraine. In 2023, its population was estimated to be 20,505.

The hromada consists of 5 populated places:

- rural settlement Avanhard
- rural settlement Khlibodarske
- rural settlement Radisne
- village Prylymanske
- village Nova Dolyna
