= Velykodolynske settlement hromada =

Coordinates: 46°20′N 30°33′E

Velykodolynske settlement hromada Великодолинська селищна громада
- Hromada
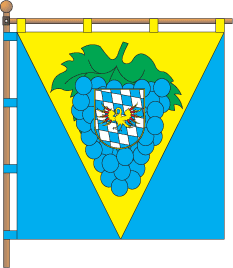
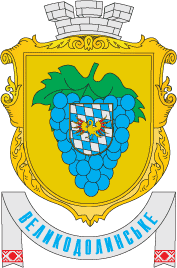
- Flag Coat of arms
- Interactive map of Velykodolynske settlement hromada
- Country: Ukraine
- Oblast: Odesa Oblast
- Raion: Odesa Raion
- Admin. center: Velykodolynske

Area
  - Total: 128.8 km^{2} (49.7 sq mi)

Population (2020)
  - Total: 16,797
  - Density: 130.4/km^{2} (337.8/sq mi)
- CATOTTG code: UA51100070000063635
- Settlements: 2
- Rural settlements: 1
- Villages: 1

Velykodolynske settlement hromada (Ukrainian: Великодолинська селищна громада) is a hromada in Odesa Raion of Odesa Oblast in southwestern Ukraine. Population: 16,797 (2020 est.)

The hromada consists of two rural settlement of Velykodolynske and a villages of Molodizhne.

== Links ==
- https://decentralization.gov.ua/newgromada/4321#
- картка Постанови ВР
