= Tairove settlement hromada =

Coordinates: 46°21′54.0″N 30°38′48.001″E

Tairove settlement hromada Таїровська селищна громада
- Hromada
- Interactive map of Tairove settlement hromada
- Country: Ukraine
- Oblast: Odesa Oblast
- Raion: Odesa Raion
- Admin. center: Tairove

Area
  - Total: 39.44 km^{2} (15.23 sq mi)

Population (2020)
  - Total: 12,311
  - Density: 312.1/km^{2} (808.5/sq mi)
- CATOTTG code: UA51100290000027993
- Settlements: 4
- Rural settlements: 1
- Villages: 3

Tairove settlement hromada is a hromada in Odesa Raion of Odesa Oblast in southwestern Ukraine. Population: 12,311 (2020 est.)

The hromada consists of a rural settlement (Tairove) and 3 villages:

- Balka
- Lymanka
- Sukhyi Lyman.

== Links ==
- картка Постанови ВР
- Таїровська селищна ОТГ // Облікова картка на офіційному вебсайті Верховної Ради України.
- gromada.info: Таїровська об'єднана територіальна громада
- Децентралізація влади: Таїровська громада
