= Dalnyk rural hromada =

Rural locality in Odesa Oblast, Ukraine

Coordinates: 46°17′N 30°30′E

Dalnyk rural territorial hromada Дальницька сільська територіальна громада
- Hromada
- Interactive map of Dalnyk rural territorial hromada
- Country: Ukraine
- Oblast: Odesa Oblast
- Raion: Odesa Raion
- Admin. center: Dalnyk

Area
  - Total: 208.9 km^{2} (80.7 sq mi)

Population
  - Total: 10,032
  - Density: 48.02/km^{2} (124.4/sq mi)
- CATOTTG code: UA51100130000021533
- Settlements: 9
- Rural settlements: 1
- Villages: 8
- Website: https://dalnycka-gromada.gov.ua/

Dalnyk rural territorial hromada (Ukrainian: Дальницька сільська територіальна громада) is a hromada in Odesa Raion of Odesa Oblast in southwestern Ukraine.

The hromada was established on August 4, 2017 as part of the administrative-territorial reform of 2015–2020 in Ukraine, and consists of one rural settlement (Bohatyrivka) and 8 villages: Dalnyk (seat of administration), Baraboy, Hrybivka, Dobrooleksandrivka, Maryanivka, Novogradkivka, Roksolany, Sanzhiyka.
