= Dalnyk, Ukraine =

Rural locality in Odesa Oblast, Ukraine

Dalnyk Дальник
- Village
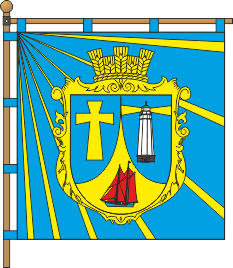
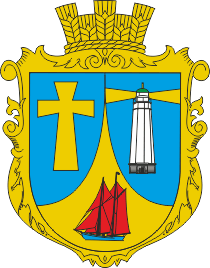
- Flag Coat of arms
- Interactive map of Dalnyk
- Location of Dalnyk Dalnyk (Ukraine)
- Coordinates: 46°13′40.9″N 30°31′56.0″E
- Country: Ukraine
- Oblast: Odesa Oblast
- Raion: Odesa Raion
- Hromada: Dalnyk rural hromada
- Founded: 1794

Area
  - Total: 3,527 km^{2} (1,362 sq mi)

Population (2001)
  - Total: 1,241
  - Density: 0.3519/km^{2} (0.9113/sq mi)
- Time zone: UTC+2 (EET)
  - Summer (DST): UTC+3 (EEST)
- Postal code: 67842
- Area code: +380 4851

Dalnyk (Ukrainian: Дальник) is a village in Odesa Raion, Odesa Oblast (province) of southwestern Ukraine. Dalnyk is administrative center of the Dalnyk rural hromada. The population is 1,241 people (2001).

== History ==
On November 7 (20), 1917, in accordance with the Third Universal of the Ukrainian Central Rada, it became part of the Ukrainian People's Republic.

At least 12 villagers died during the Holodomor of 1932–1933.

== See also ==
- List of settlements affected by the Holodomor of 1932–1933 (Odesa region)
