= Velykodolynske =

Rural locality in Odesa Oblast, Ukraine

Velykodolynske Великодолинське
- Rural settlement
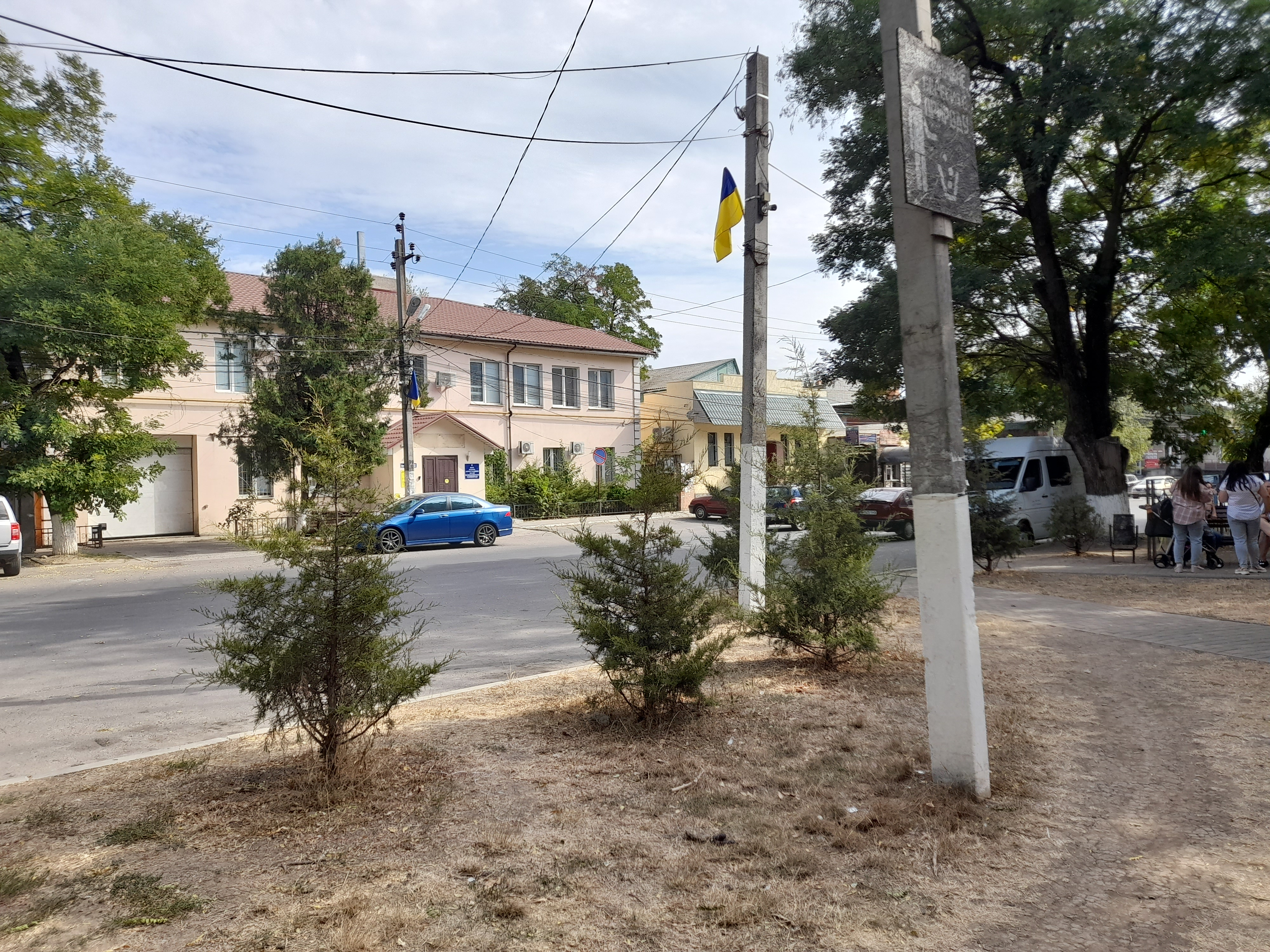
- Main street

- Location within Odesa Oblast Location within Ukraine
- Coordinates: 46°20′41″N 30°34′42″E
- Country: Ukraine
- Oblast: Odesa Oblast
- Raion: Odesa Raion
- Hromada: Velykodolynske settlement hromada

Population (2022)
  - Total: 14,012
- Time zone: UTC+2 (EET)
  - Summer (DST): UTC+3 (EEST)

Velykodolynske (Ukrainian: Великодолинське, Russian: Великодолинское) is a rural settlement in Odesa Raion of Odesa Oblast in Ukraine. It is located approximately 10 kilometres (6.2 mi) southwest of the city of Odesa and 5 kilometres (3.1 mi) from the Black Sea coast. Velykodolynske hosts the administration of Velykodolynske settlement hromada, one of the hromadas of Ukraine. Population: 14,012 (2022 estimate)

== History ==
Velykodolynske was founded in 1803 by Odesa governor Armand-Emmanuel du Plessis de Richelieu who settled German colonists (Black Sea Germans) on the site. The place was named Gross Liebenthal and had two Lutheran churches. It received the name of Bolshaya Akkarzha in 1918 and its current name in 1945.

Until 18 July 2020, Velykodolynske belonged to Ovidiopol Raion. The raion was abolished in July 2020 as part of the administrative reform of Ukraine, which reduced the number of raions of Odesa Oblast to seven. The area of Ovidiopol Raion was split between Bilhorod-Dnistrovskyi and Odesa Raions, with Velykodolynske being transferred to Odesa Raion.

Until 26 January 2024, Velykodolynske was designated urban-type settlement. On this day, a new law entered into force which abolished this status, and Velykodolynske became a rural settlement.

== Economy ==
=== Transportation ===
There are three railway stations in the settlement, Akkarzha, Post 25 km, and Post 22 km. They are all on the railway connecting Odesa and Bilhorod-Dnistrovskyi. There is infrequent passenger traffic.

Highway H33 connecting Odesa with Bilhorod-Dnistrovskyi runs through the settlement.
