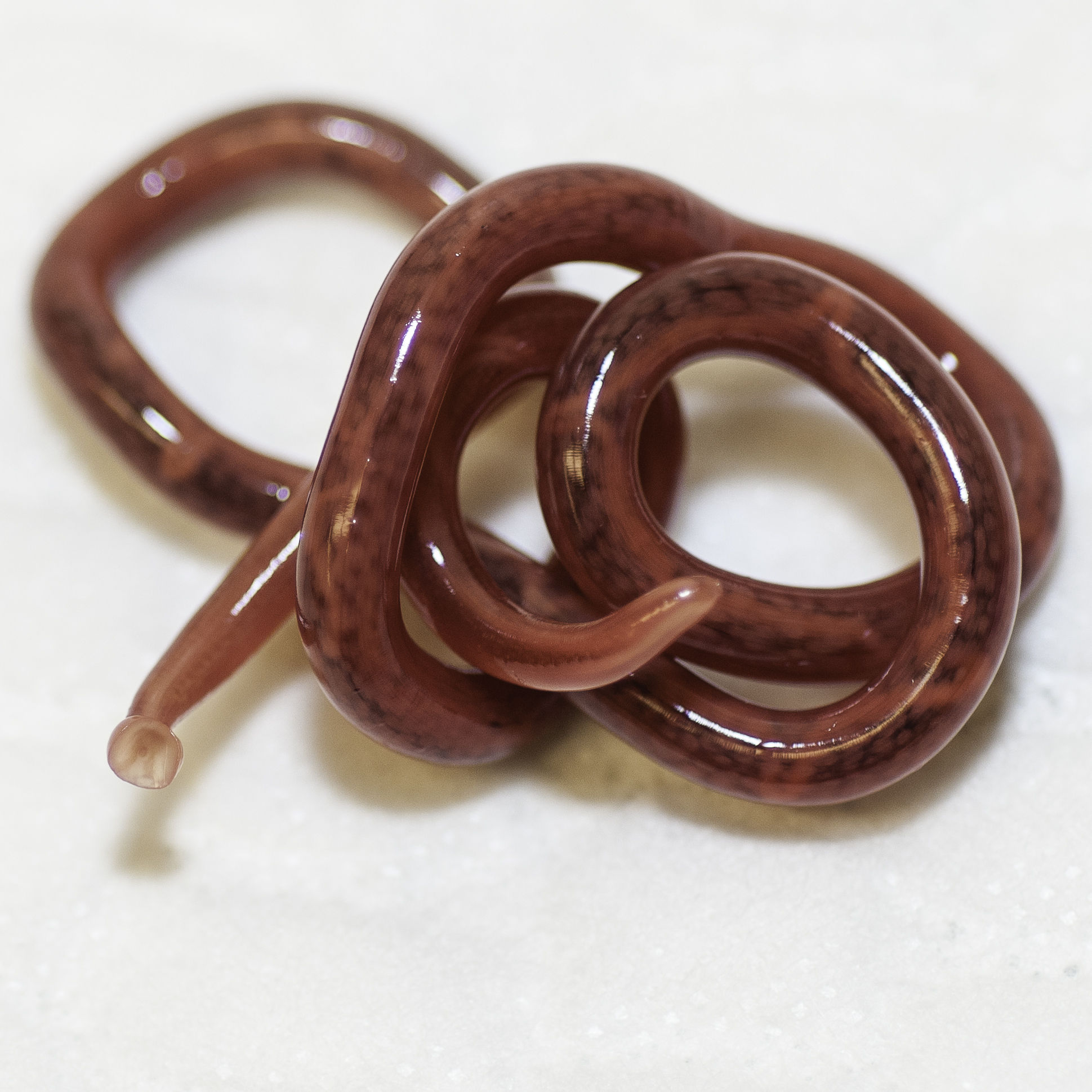
- Dioctophyme renale that was free floating in the abdomen of a dog

Scientific classification
- Kingdom: Animalia
- Phylum: Nematoda
- Class: Enoplea
- Order: Dioctophymatida
- Family: Dioctophymidae
- Genus: Dioctophyme
- Species: D. renale

Binomial name
- Dioctophyme renale (Goeze, 1782)

= Dioctophyme renale =

Species of roundworm

Dioctophyme renale, commonly referred to as the giant kidney worm, is a parasitic nematode (roundworm) whose mature form is found in the kidneys of mammals. D. renale is distributed worldwide, but is less common in Africa and Oceania. It affects fish-eating mammals, particularly mink and dogs. Human infestation is rare, but results in kidney destruction, usually of one kidney and hence not fatal. A 2019 review listed a total of 37 known human cases of dioctophymiasis in 10 countries with the highest number (22) in China. Upon diagnosis through tissue sampling, the only treatment is surgical excision.

== Synonyms ==
Dioctophymosis, dioctophymiasis, giant kidney worm, kidney worm infection, Dioctophyme renale infection

== History of discovery ==
Dioctophyme renale was discovered in 1583. Almost two centuries later, in 1782, Johann Goeze first described D. renale upon discovering the worms in a dog kidney. The family Dioctophymidae has only one genus (Dioctophyme), and the name of the genus was in contention (with the possibility of being Dioctophyma) for two hundred years. The issue was finally resolved by the International Commission on Zoological Nomenclature in 1987. In 2003, D. renale eggs were discovered in six human coprolites in the Neolithic site Arbon-Bleiche 3, Switzerland. This location is near a lake, which likely provided early humans with access to freshwater fish and frogs. The samples were dated from 3384 to 3370 BC, and is evidence that the prevalence of this infection was higher in early human history (before full understanding of proper cooking techniques). Eggs were also found in 2019 in a well-preserved largely fish-eating settlement in England dating to 900 BC.

== Dioctophymosis ==
=== Clinical presentation in humans ===
Individuals with Dioctophyme renale infestation (known as dioctophymosis) typically present with unspecific symptoms including hematuria (blood in urine), nephritis, loin pain, renal enlargement, and/or renal colic (intermittent pain in the kidney area), which may result from the rare migration of worms through ureters. In some cases the fibrosis occurring after parasite infection is an incidental finding in ultrasound or CT scan, mimicking renal cancer, leading to radical nephrectomy.

Adult worms typically only infect one kidney. The kidney is destroyed because of fibrosis, the development of excess fibrous connective tissue. Global renal dysfunction is typically limited because the non-infected kidney is usually capable of assuming the increased work. However, parenchymal inflammation can lead to death in extreme circumstances.

=== Transmission and life cycle ===
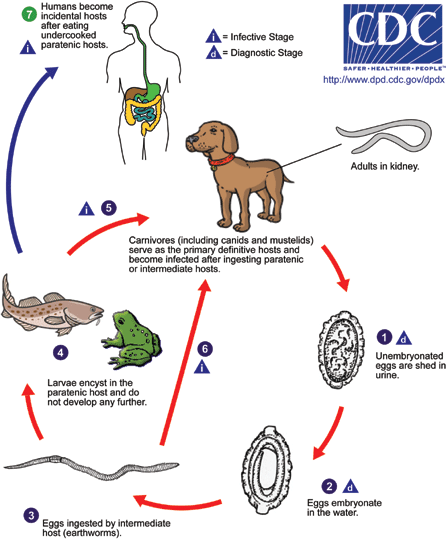
Life cycle of Dioctophyme renale

Adult Dioctophyme renale inhabit the kidney (typically the right kidney). Females produce eggs which are passed in urine. In aquatic environments, eggs embryonate after 15–100 days. These eggs are ingested by an aquatic oligochaete, hatch, penetrate blood vessels, and develop into a stage three larvae. A paratenic host may then ingest the oligochaete. The oligochaete or paratenic host is then eaten by a definitive host, wherein juveniles penetrate intestinal lining and migrate to the liver. After maturing for approximately 50 days, the juveniles then migrate to the kidneys (typically the right kidney). Upon maturation, D. renale can survive for up to five years.

Definitive hosts are carnivorous mammals, notably mink, but also includes wolves, coyotes, foxes, dogs, raccoons, and weasels.

Transmission to humans typically occurs upon ingestion of raw or undercooked freshwater fish or frog.

There are multiple reservoirs for D. renale. Confirmed cases of infection have occurred in minks, dogs, swine, bears, oxen, and humans.

=== Morphology ===
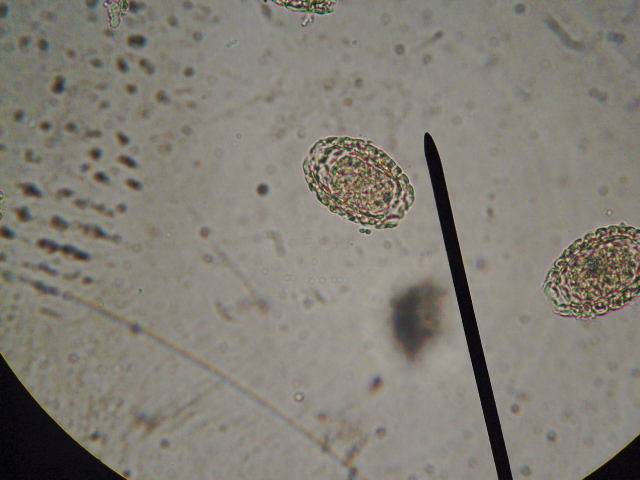
Dioctophyme renale eggs exhibiting the characteristic pitted and sculptured shell

D. renale is the largest nematode known to parasitize humans. Adult male worms are 20–40 cm long and 5–6 mm wide; females can grow to 103 cm in length with a width of 10–12 mm. Both sexes appear bright red in color and taper at both the anterior and posterior ends. Male D. renale worms have a bursa, which is used to attach to facilitate mating.

Eggs are 60–80 micrometres x 39–47 micrometres, contain an embryo, and have characteristic sculpturing of the shell. They have an oval-shape and brownish-yellow hue. Eggs have a thick shell, and the surface appears to be pitted except at the poles.

=== Diagnosis ===
The only means of obtaining a definitive diagnosis is through the identification of D. renale eggs in a patient's urine. However, obtaining patient history (i.e., if the patient has consumed undercooked or raw freshwater fish) is an important first step that can be coupled with radiological exams to search for enlarged or calcified kidneys. Urinalysis will likely show hematuria; blood tests may reveal eosinophilia.

=== Management ===
Likely because of the rarity of human cases, there is no standard treatment for D. renale infection in humans. The only known means is surgical excision of either adult worms or the infected kidney. Nephrectomy is generally considered extreme for human cases.

A physician reportedly used Ivermectin to treat a patient, who was effectively cured. The use of anti-helminth drugs has not yet been evaluated as the proper course of action to treat this infection.

=== Epidemiology ===
Though D. renale is distributed worldwide, it is markedly less frequent in Africa and Oceania, where human infection is extremely rare. Regions around the Caspian Sea have the highest number of cases, with the most occurring in Iran. Infections are also most commonly found in areas where freshwater fish is a dietary mainstay.

Non-human infections are more common worldwide, especially in areas of temperate climate. Prevalence in mink populations may be high, such as portions of Ontario or Minnesota. Similarly, some minnow populations may be as high as 50%.

=== Public health and prevention strategies ===
No public health measures have been undertaken or vaccines developed because of the rarity of human infection. The majority of D. renale infections have resulted from undercooked or raw freshwater fish consumption. Thus, the simple practice of thoroughly cooking fish prior to consumption could be promoted and lead to eradication of D. renale infection in humans.

== See also ==
- List of parasites (human)
