= Ergasilus curticrus =

Scientific classification
- Domain: Eukaryota
- Kingdom: Animalia
- Phylum: Arthropoda
- Class: Copepoda
- Order: Cyclopoida
- Family: Ergasilidae
- Genus: Ergasilus
- Species: E. curticrus

Binomial name
- Ergasilus curticrus Muriel-Hoyos, Santana-Pineros, Cruz-Quintana, & Suárez-Morales, 2015

Parasitic copepod

Ergasilus curticrus is a freshwater parasitic copepod named in 2015. Described from the Orinoco river basin, it was found solely to be hosted by individuals of the Characiform fish species Bryconops giacopinii. Of those located in South America, it is one of only five species in its genus to be found outside of Brazil.

== Description ==
Ergasilus curticrus is a small gill parasite that ranges from 581–758 μm, with an average of 675 μm. Its swimming legs are biramous (two-branched), with the endopod (outer branch) longer than the exopod (inner branch), and one of its most distinctive features involves its fourth swimming leg. The exopod therein has only a single segment, where the rest of its swimming legs (legs 1-3) have between 4 and 6. It is not uncommon for members of Ergasilus to be equipped with setae (stiff hairlike structures) on various body parts, and in E. curticrus the endopods of legs 2 and 3 only have a singular seta.

=== Sexual dimorphism ===
Members of Ergasilus display remarkable sexual dimorphism. Mature females are largely gill parasites, and males are planktonic and free-swimming, as well as the young. E. curticrus is no exception to this, originally described from a collection of 14 female specimens collected from the gills of characoid fish.

== Taxonomy ==
Ergasilus is a remarkably speciose genus with nearly 200 species named and accepted. E. curticrus is a relatively recent addition, described in 2015. (The most recent addition is Ergasilus yandemontei, described in 2021.) It has no known scientific synonyms, having retained its original name since discovery.

=== Etymology ===
The specific name "curticrus" means "short leg". The Latin "curti-" means "short" (consider the word "curt"), and "crus" means "leg" or "lower leg" (especially in anatomy). This is in reference to the unique brevity of the exopod associated with the fourth swimming leg. The meaning of the generic name Ergasilus is unknown; etymology was not provided upon description of the type species, Ergasilus sieboldi, by Alexander von Nordmann in 1832.

Ergasilus curticrus has no species-specific common name, but members of Ergasilis as a genus are commonly referred to as "gill lice".

== Distribution and habitat ==
While 69 species of Ergasilus are known from Brazil, only 5 in South America are known from outside of it. E. curticrus is the first new species to be described from the Orinoco, and one of three from Colombia. Specifically, it is found in the Vichada river. It is the only Colombian ergasilid from the Eastern Plains region of the Orinoco watershed. Other species of ergasilids have been described worldwide.

== Diet and ecology ==
Ergasilus curticrus is only known to parasitize Bryconops giacopinii. This level of host specificity is not unknown in South American ergasilids. Ergasilids attach to a host by way of a specialized claw on the tip of their second pair of antennae, and members of Ergasilus specifically consume gill tissue, which includes blood, mucus, and gill epithelium.

Severe infection by Ergasilus parasites has been shown to reduce the oxygen intake of infected fish, largely by obstruction of gill filaments. It can also make the fish in question overproduce gill mucus as an immune response, further interfering with proper oxygen intake.
