= Eustrongylidosis =

Parasitic disease

Eustrongylidosis is a parasitic disease that mainly affects wading birds worldwide; however, the parasite's complex, indirect lifecycle involves other species, such as aquatic worms and fish. Moreover, this disease is zoonotic, which means the parasite can transmit disease from animals to humans. Eustrongylidosis is named after the causative agent Eustrongylides, and typically occurs in eutrophicated waters where concentrations of nutrients and minerals are high enough to provide ideal conditions for the parasite to thrive and persist. Because eutrophication has become a common issue due to agricultural runoff and urban development, cases of eustrongylidosis are becoming prevalent and hard to control. Eustrongylidosis can be diagnosed before or after death by observing behavior and clinical signs, and performing fecal flotations and necropsies. Methods to control it include preventing eutrophication and providing hosts with uninfected food sources in aquaculture farms. Parasites are known to be indicators of environmental health and stability, so should be studied further to better understand the parasite's lifecycle and how it affects predator-prey interactions and improve conservation efforts.

== Cause ==
Eustrongylidosis is caused by several species of roundworms. The nematodes are red, large, and easily noticeable, and are characterized by the absence of a posterior sucker. These roundworms cause a high mortality rate in nesting egrets and other wading birds, including other coastal populations. The parasite was first detected in fish. The parasite is then transferred from the fish to the waterfowl when the bird is eating the fish. After consumption, the parasite perforates through the stomach lining, often resulting in the death of the host.

== Lifecycle ==
Eustrongylidosis is caused by three species of Eustrongylides: E. ignotus, E. tubifex, and E. excisus. Eustrongylides spp. are macroscopic roundworms or nematodes that reproduce sexually year-round. The parasite has a complex lifecycle that involves two intermediate hosts, a paratenic host, and a definitive host. Therefore, the lifecycle is indirect because the parasite has to infect other species to reach its final host and become sexually mature and reproduce. Intermediate hosts and definitive hosts provide the parasite transport to other hosts and a place to develop, whereas paratenic hosts only provide transport to other hosts. The cycle begins when the wading bird excretes feces in or nearby a water body. In the feces, the eggs are shed, and once they reach the water, an oligochaete, or aquatic worm, feeds on the eggs and becomes the first intermediate host. Within the oligochaete, the parasite eggs hatch and develop into second- and third-stage larvae. When a fish feeds on the infected oligochaete, it becomes the second intermediate host and the parasite develops into a fourth-stage larva. Finally, when a wading bird feeds on the infected fish, it becomes the definitive or final host and Eustrongylides becomes sexually mature. The parasite becomes an adult within three to five hours after infection and sheds eggs within 14 to 23 days after infection. The cycle repeats itself when the parasite becomes sexually mature and sheds eggs through the feces of the bird to the external environment. If a larger fish, amphibian, or reptile feeds on the infected fish before the wading bird does, it becomes a paratenic host until fed on by the definitive host.

== Species affected ==
Eustrongylides spp. have been found in a variety of wildlife species, including freshwater fishes, such as perch (Perca fluviatilis), sheat fish (Silurus glanis), pike (Esox lucius), pikeperch (Sander lucioperca), and sun perch (Lepomis eupomotis gibbosus). Eustrongylides spp. have also been observed in wading birds (Ciconiiformes), including great blue herons (Ardea herodias), great egrets (Casmerodius albus), and snowy egrets (Egretta thula).

== Distribution ==
Eustrongylides spp. have been reported throughout most of the world. Within the United States, E. tubifex and E. ignotus have been observed in wildlife. This disease can be found in rookeries, especially in areas consisting of dense bird populations. These species are also found in nesting habitats of birds, including areas with a low tree understory.

== Clinical signs ==
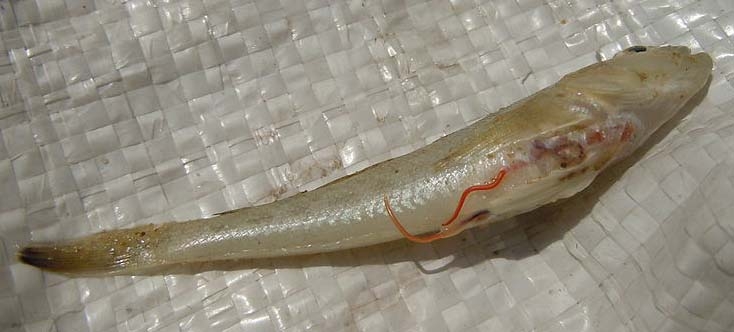
Monkey goby infected with the larvae of nematodes Eustrongylides excisus, Dniester Estuary, Ukraine

Eustrongylides has evolved to infect the outside surface of the ventriculus of birds or the stomach in fish. This is due to the bird's response to parasitic infections, which involves regurgitating food to remove the parasite from their bodies. By inhabiting the outside of the stomach, though, the bird cannot get rid of the parasite and continually regurgitates food until it becomes emaciated. Furthermore, the presence of the parasite in the ventriculus causes secondary infections such as bacterial peritonitis, the inflammation of the abdominal cavity walls, and sepsis, the infiltration of bacteria in the blood, when the parasite penetrates the stomach. Birds less than a week old are more susceptible to eustrongylidosis than older birds for several reasons. First, their immune system is still developing and weak. Second, sibling competition for food is common in young birds. Finally, their growth rates become suppressed, so they tend to die before the parasite becomes sexually mature and sheds eggs. Unlike young birds, older birds develop chronic eustrongylidosis because of their stronger immune systems. Similar to young birds, old birds have lesions in their ventriculi and develop secondary infections. A common behavior in both young and old birds includes regurgitation of food, which leads to lack of appetite and eventually anorexia or emaciation. In some cases, the parasite can inhabit the lung and cause respiratory problems that increase stress levels and severity of the disease. In fish, the parasite affects its body condition, making it more susceptible to predation rather than to the disease. Since the parasite depends on the intermediate host to reach the definitive host, it cannot harm the fish without first luring it to its predator, the wading bird.

== Diagnosis ==
Diagnosis in a live specimen is possible in the field by palpating the abdomen. As with birds, prominence of the keel could be a determinant in diagnosis, but natural history of the species needs to be understood to avoid potential misdiagnoses. The best form of diagnosis, though is as necropsy. During the necropsy, the best diagnosis can be determined by scanning the adult nematodes with electron microscopy. Different species Eustrongylides nematodes can be differentiated by specific gender characteristics, i.e. "Male specimens of E. ignotus have a caudal sucker that lacks cuticular cleft, while a cuticular cleft is present in the caudal sucker of male specimens of E. excisus". "Eustrongylidosis can often be misdiagnosed as starvation in nestlings because they are often emaciated at the time of death".

Before necropsy takes place, diagnosis by palpation can be used to find tubular lesions, which are firm in texture, firmly attached to organs, and felt in the subcutaneous tissue. While palpation is practical and simple, errors can be made in nestlings' examinations because their ribs have the potential to present as lesions. Diagnosis is also attainable by examining fecal samples, but has the high potential of false negatives. That possibility is increased in fledging feces "where severe disease may precede appearance of eggs in the feces".

== Prevention and control ==
Because of Eustrongylides species' complex lifecycle with various host species, preventing infection and controlling outbreaks is difficult. Outbreaks of this disease are closely linked to agricultural runoff and urban development. Eutrophication of water bodies supports high population levels of oligochaete worms, which causes increased numbers of infected fish that eat the worms, and then the birds that eat the fish.

One way to prevent eustrongylidosis is to control oligochaete populations. Outbreaks of this parasite are closely linked to high numbers of oligochaete worms in an area's waterways, because the worms are essential for the species to reproduce. Oligochaete populations can be controlled by monitoring nutrient levels in the water, because high nutrient levels support oligochaete populations. They can also be controlled by decreasing the level of oxygen in the water. Encouraging responsible farming practices to reduce chemical run-off can help prevent this disease from occurring.

Managers need to be diligent in catching the symptoms of the parasite before it can become an outbreak. Once an outbreak of eustrongylidosis has occurred, ecosystem managers can do little to stop the spread in oligochaetes, fish, and birds. Traditional anthelminthics (dewormers) are not effective in fish because they kill parasites that live inside the gastrointestinal tract, whereas Eustrongylides species live outside the stomach in the body cavity. The parasites can only be removed from fish surgically, which is not feasible. To completely stop the lifecycle in fish, all fish in an affected area must be culled.

Surgical removal of the parasite from wading birds is a viable option, but this would also not be feasible for a large number of birds, and it would not stop the cycle of infection.

== Treatment ==
Treatment for eustrongylidosis is limited in the wading-bird population due to the extensive amount of perforation in the stomach lining and limited funds available for treatment. In humans who are infected with the parasites, surgery is required to remove it from the intestinal wall. As surgery is not a feasible treatment option for wading fowl in the wild en masse, treatment of the infected birds (a large portion of wild populations) has not been found, nor will likely be practical. A possibility exists that killing or removing the nematodes could do more harm to the host specimen than actual good.
