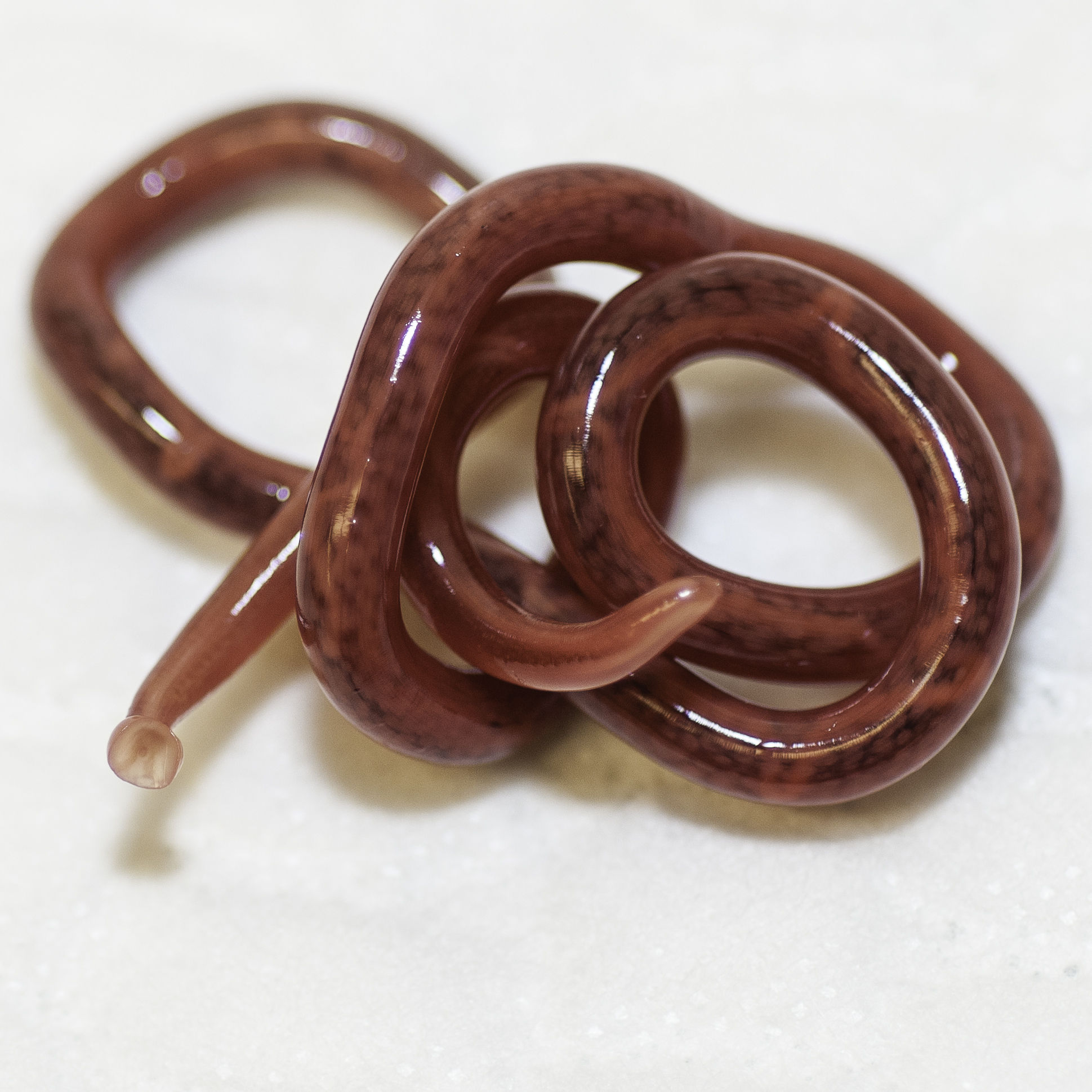
- Image of Giant Kidney Worm

Scientific classification
- Domain: Eukaryota
- Kingdom: Animalia
- Phylum: Nematoda
- Class: Chromadorea
- Order: Ascaridida
- Family: Dioctophymidae
- Genus: Dioctophyme; Collet-Meygret, 1802

Synonyms
- Dioctophyma Bosc, 1803 (Missp.); Dioctophymus Rafinesque, 1815 (Missp.); Dyctophymus Rafinesque, 1815 (Missp.); Dioctophryme Agassiz, 1843 (Missp.); Dictophyme Chiaje, 1844 (Missp.); Eustrongylus Diesing, 1851 (Preocc.); Eustrongilus Fedtschenko, 1874 (Missp.); Enstrongylus Pease & Smith, 1905 (Missp.); Mirandonema Kreis, 1945

= Dioctophyme =

Genus of roundworms

Dioctophyme is a monotypic genus of nematodes belonging to the family Dioctophymidae. The only species is Dioctophyme renale. Much older literature uses the alternative spelling "Dioctophyma" and the family name "Dioctophymatidae" but these alternative spellings were suppressed by the ICZN in a 1987 ruling.

The species is found in Northern America and Japan.
