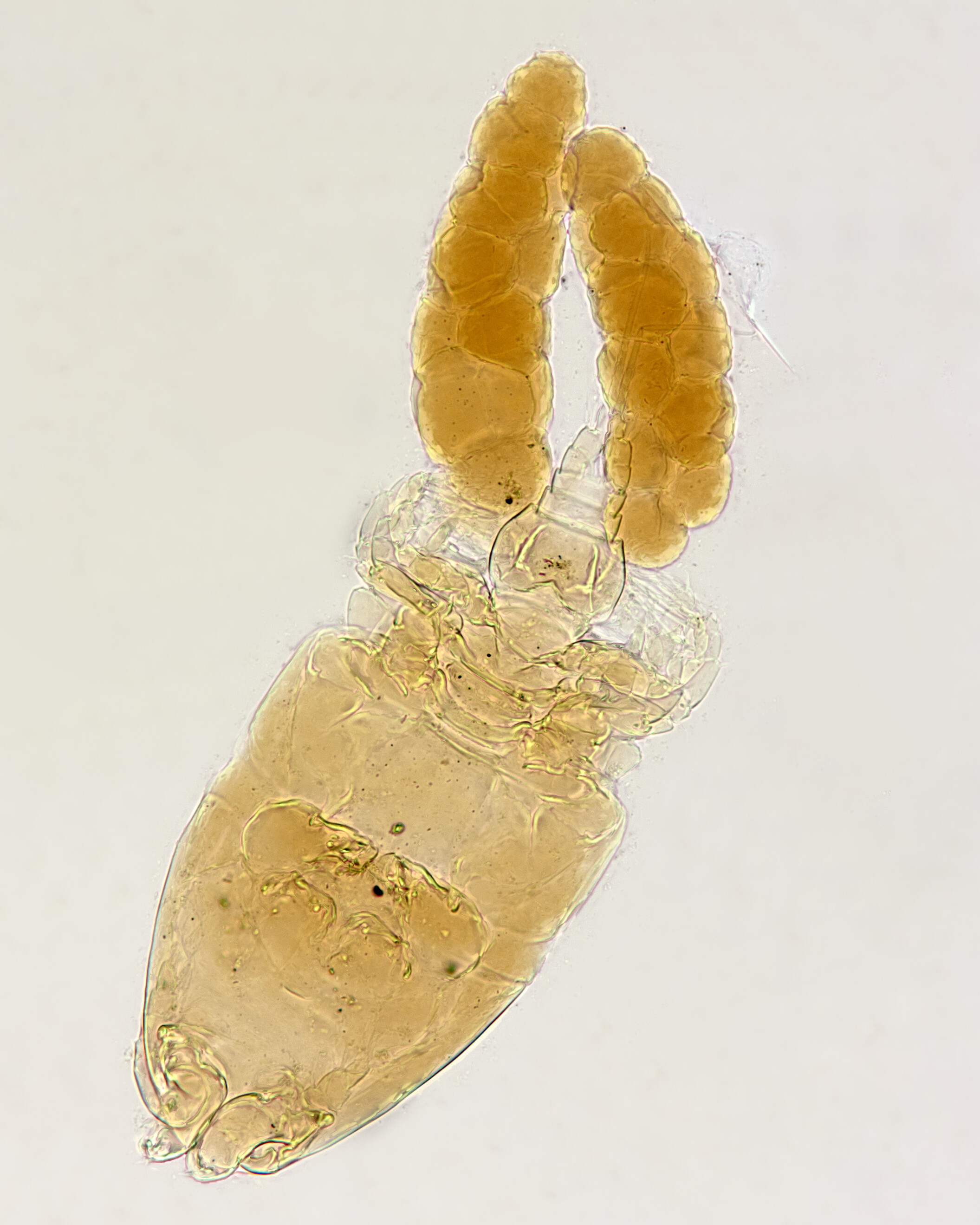
- Type specimen from Te Papa Tongarewa

Scientific classification
- Kingdom: Animalia
- Phylum: Arthropoda
- Class: Copepoda
- Order: Cyclopoida
- Family: Ergasilidae
- Genus: Abergasilus; Hewitt, 1978
- Species: A. amplexus

Binomial name
- Abergasilus amplexus Hewitt, 1978

= Abergasilus =

Genus of crustaceans

Abergasilus amplexus is a species of parasitic copepod endemic to euryhaline habitats in New Zealand. It is the only known species in the genus Abergasilus.

== Description ==
This species is unique among ergasilids in that it only has three pairs of legs: the fourth and fifth pairs are reduced to single spines or are completely absent. The second antenna is very distinctive, hooks on the last and penultimate segments creating an obviously claw-like structure, more obvious in the female. The male is free-living, forming part of the plankton. Both sexes have an average length of 0.5 mm.

== Hosts ==
The main host appears to be Anguilla australis: in Lake Ellesmere / Te Waihora, infestation rates on this eel approach 100%, sometimes with over 100 parasites on the gills of a single fish. Other recorded host species include Anguilla dieffenbachii, Arripis trutta, Carassius auratus, Galaxias maculatus, Perca fluviatilis, Pseudophycis bachus, Retropinna retropinna, Rhombosolea leporina, Rhombosolea plebeia and Rhombosolea retiaria.
