= Hystrichis =

Scientific classification
- Domain: Eukaryota
- Kingdom: Animalia
- Phylum: Nematoda
- Class: Chromadorea
- Order: Ascaridida
- Family: Dioctophymidae
- Genus: Hystrichis; Dujardin, 1845

Genus of roundworms

Hystrichis is a genus of nematode worm with a spinose anterior end, resembling the introvert of priapulids. Species of Hystrichis live mainly in the digestive tract of aquatic birds.
