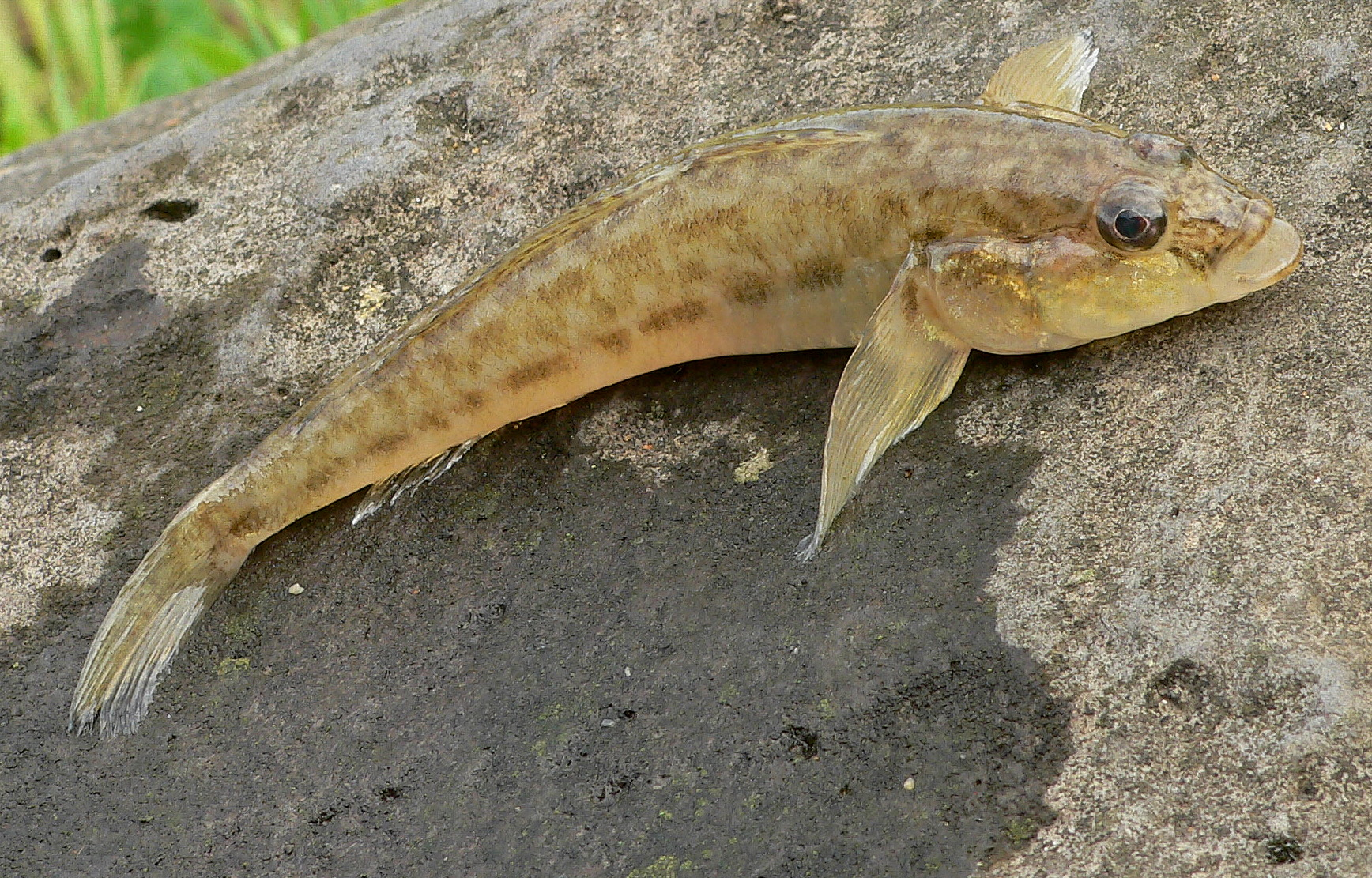

Conservation status
- Least Concern (IUCN 3.1)

Scientific classification
- Kingdom: Animalia
- Phylum: Chordata
- Class: Actinopterygii
- Division: Teleostei
- Order: Gobiiformes
- Family: Gobiidae
- Genus: Neogobius
- Species: N. fluviatilis

Binomial name
- Neogobius fluviatilis (Pallas, 1814)
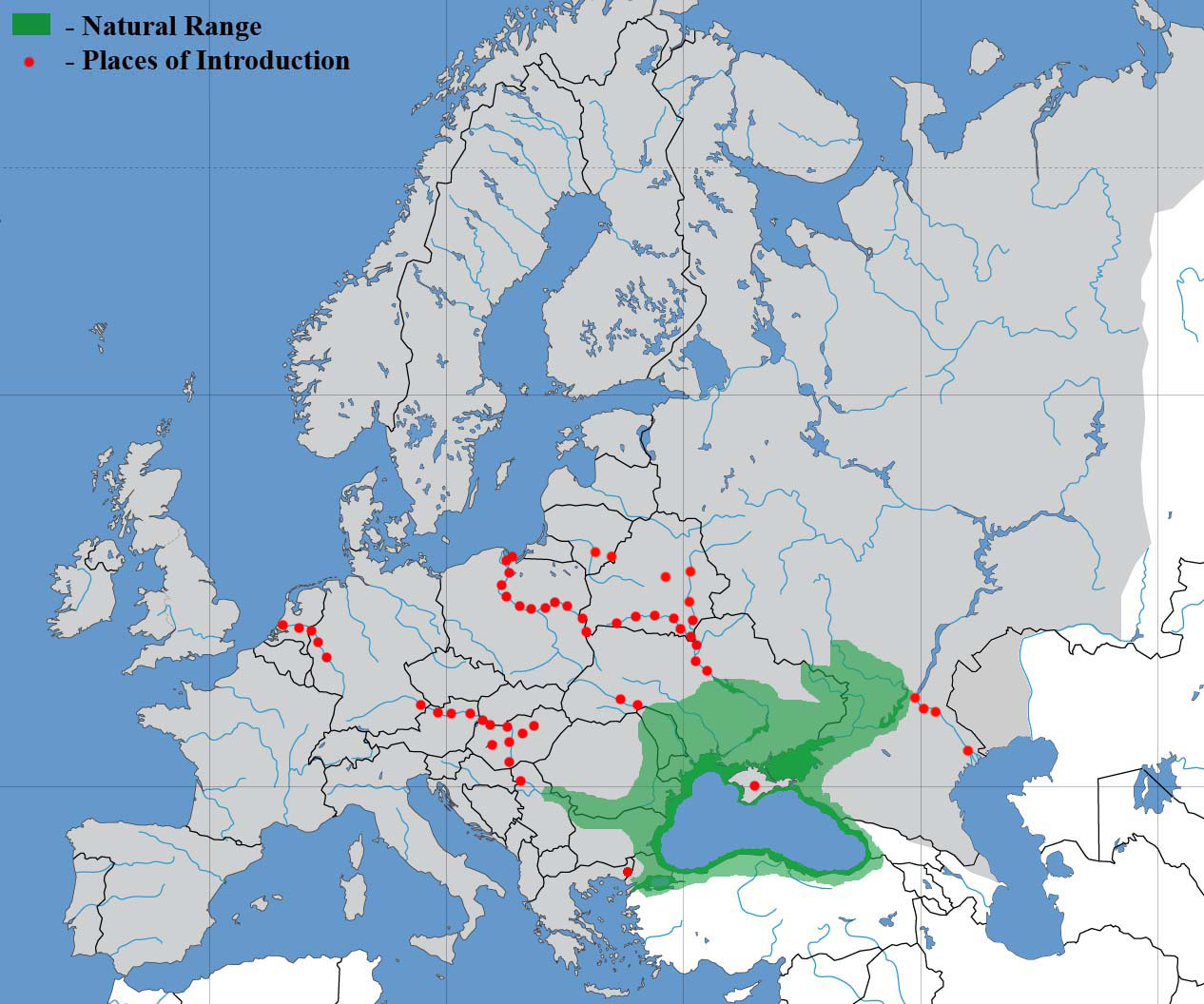
- The range of the Monkey goby

Synonyms
- Gobius fluviatilis Pallas, 1814; Apollonia fluviatilis (Pallas, 1814); Neogobius fluviatilis fluviatilis (Pallas, 1814); Gobius sordidus E. T. Bennett, 1835; Gobius lacteus Nordmann, 1840; Gobius stevenii Nordmann, 1840; Gobius fluviatilis nigra Kessler, 1859

= Monkey goby =

Species of fish

The monkey goby (Neogobius fluviatilis) is a species of goby native to the basins of the Black Sea and the Sea of Azov.

== Characteristics ==
The monkey goby is covered with cycloid scales on the head, nape, back, one third of the gill covers, bases of the pectoral fins, and the posterior half of the throat and belly. Its second dorsal fin is small in size compared to the posterior end of the body. The width of its head is equal to or a bit greater than the height of the head, and terminates in an acuminated, or leaf-shaped, snout. The jaws of Neogobius fluviatilis contain small, conical teeth and the mandibles are set forward in the skull. The abdomen of the monkey goby is lined with suckers that stretch from the collar to the anus. Its coloration is a brownish gray or a yellowish gray, usually with a very pale brown pattern of dark merged spots. Rows of dark spots are also found on the dorsal and caudal fins. The average adult monkey goby measures 7–10 cm (2.8–3.9 in), but has been known to grow to lengths of 18–20 cm (7.1–7.9 in). This species weighs around 50 g (1.8 oz).

== Range ==
The natural habitat of the monkey goby is the fresh and brackish waters of basins in the Black Sea and the Sea of Marmara. In the basin of the Sea of Marmara, it is a common sight in Manyas, Sapanca, and the Kazoli River in Bosporus Strait. In the Black Sea and the surrounding areas, the monkey goby is common in all desalinated water including the Danube river and its tributaries, the lagoons and estuaries of the north-western part of the Black Sea, the Sea of Azov, and the rivers of Caucasus. Recently, the monkey goby has been registered as an invasive species in some countries of Europe. In 1970, the species was first declared as a non-indigenous in Lake Balaton in Hungary. The monkey goby was discovered in the Middle Danube in Hungary in 1984. In 2001 it was found to have spread to the Slovak-Hungarian sector of the Danube River. In the basin of the Baltic Sea it was first registered as an invasive species in 1997. The species has also become a common sight in the Włocławek Reservoir and Zegrze Reservoir. The monkey goby has been found in the German part of the river Rhine since March 2009. It has also been found in the Waal River, near Nijmegen, the Netherlands.

In August 2011 the monkey goby is registered for the first time in the Evros River (Greece), which is inflows to the Aegean Sea.

In the Volga River basin, the monkey goby is widely distributed in the unregulated sections and reservoirs of the Lower and Middle Volga, with occasional occurrences in the Upper Volga and the lower reaches of the Kama River. Genetic marker analysis has shown that the Volga populations belong to a phylogenetic lineage originating from the Azov-Black Sea basin, likely introduced through a combination of natural dispersal via canal systems and accidental transport during historical stocking efforts.

== Feeding ==
The monkey goby belongs to the group known as malacophages, but molluscs have lower importance in its diet than in that of the round goby. However, in the Sea of Azov molluscs (mainly Abra segmentum) make up 85% of its diet. In the Gulf of Tendra its diet is dominated by polychaetes, the larvae of Chironomidae, molluscs, Cerastoderma, juvenile gobies, adult marbled gobies, and crustaceans such as amphipods and shrimp. In the Danube lakes Yalpug and Kugurluy, the diet of the monkey goby consists of amphipods, molluscs, and Oligochaeta.

In the Khadzhibey Estuary a dozen species of prey make up the diet of monkey goby. Polychaetes, larvae of insects, and shrimp are present in the diet year round. Seasonal dietary additions include crabs such as Rhithropanopeus harrisii, sea weed such as Zostera marina, and amphipods such as Marinogammarus olivii. Certain planktonic crustaceans are also present in the diet of adult gobies.

== Parasites ==
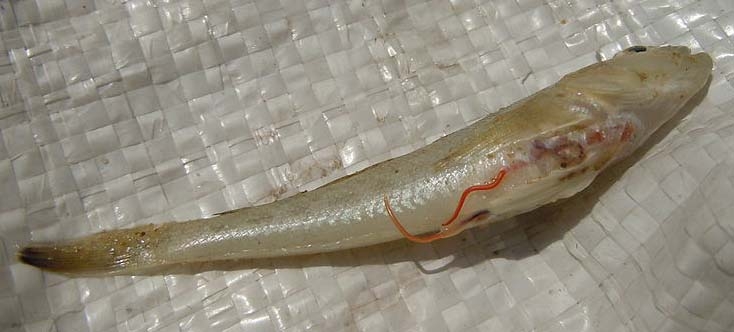
Monkey goby infected with the larvae of nematodes Eustrongylides excisus, Dniester Estuary, Ukraine

In the northwestern Black Sea, twelve parasite species are known to infect the monkey goby. The core of the parasitic fauna are a trio metacercariae composed of Сryptocotyle concavum, Сryptocotyle lingua, and Рygidiopsis genata. Other common parasites include the nematode Dichelyne minutus and the cestoda Ligula pavlovskii. The trematode parasites C. lingua and P. genata can also infest humans. In the 1950s, along the coast of the Gulf of Taganrog in the Sea of Azov, the monkey goby was registered as a host of epizootic of nematodes Tetrameres fissispina and Streptocara crassicauda, which are fatal to ducklings.

== Importance ==
In Ukraine the monkey goby is a crucial commercial fish, especially in the Sea of Azov and Dnieper-Bug Estuary. It plays an important role in the food chain by serving as prey for other predatory fish living in these areas.
