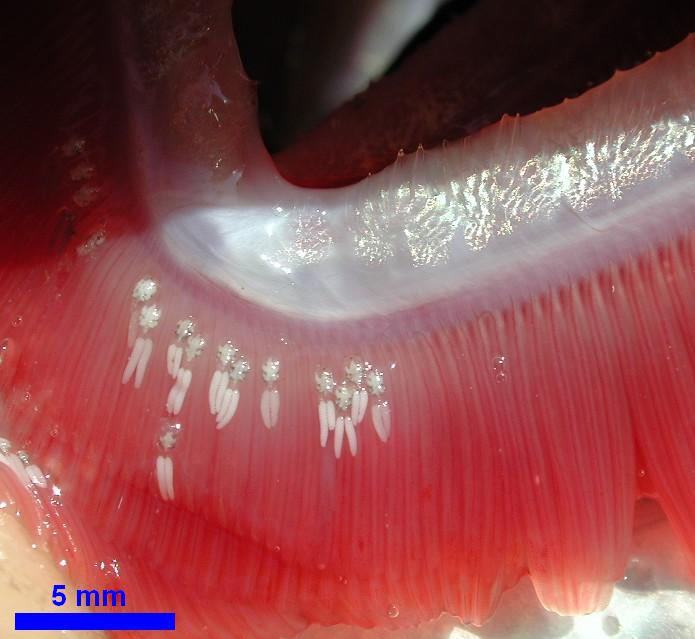
- Ergasilus sp. females with one pair of eggs each on gills of northern pike

Scientific classification
- Kingdom: Animalia
- Phylum: Arthropoda
- Clade: Pancrustacea
- Class: Copepoda
- Order: Cyclopoida
- Family: Ergasilidae
- Genus: Ergasilus; Nordmann, 1832

Species
- See text

= Ergasilus =

Genus of crustaceans

Ergasilus is a genus of copepod crustaceans occurring in both the ocean and fresh water, often called gill lice. The females are parasitic upon the gills of fishes. Being copepods, gill lice have a single median eye on their head. The second antennae are modified into prehensile pincers. Male gill lice are free-living.

Species include:

- Ergasilus anchoratus Markevich, 1946
- Ergasilus arthrosis L. S. Roberts, 1969
- Ergasilus auritus Markevich, 1940
- Ergasilus briani Markevich, 1932
- Ergasilus caeruleus C. B. Wilson, 1911
- Ergasilus celestis J. F. Müller, 1937
- Ergasilus centrarchidarum Wright, 1882
- Ergasilus cerastes L. S. Roberts, 1969
- Ergasilus chautauquaensis Fellows, 1887
- Ergasilus clupeidarum S. K. Johnson & W. A. Rogers, 1972
- Ergasilus cotti Kellicott, 1892
- Ergasilus curticrus Muriel-Hoyos, Santana-Pineros, Cruz-Quintana & Suarez-Morales, 2015
- Ergasilus cyanopictus
- Ergasilus cyprinaceus W. A. Rogers, 1969
- Ergasilus elongatus C. B. Wilson, 1916
- Ergasilus ereimia Vandenberg, 2026
- Ergasilus felichthys (Pearse, 1947)
- Ergasilus fryeri
- Ergasilus funduli Krøyer, 1863
- Ergasilus gibbus Von Nordmann, 1832
- Ergasilus globosus
- Ergasilus labracis Krøyer, 1863
- Ergasilus lamellifer Fryer, 1961
- Ergasilus lanceolatus C. B. Wilson, 1916
- Ergasilus lizae Krøyer, 1863
- Ergasilus longimanus
- Ergasilus luciopercarum Henderson, 1926
- Ergasilus manicatus C. B. Wilson, 1911
- Ergasilus megaceros C. B. Wilson, 1916
- Ergasilus mugilis Vogt, 1877
- Ergasilus myctarothes
- Ergasilus nerkae L. S. Roberts, 1963
- Ergasilus orientalis
- Ergasilus rhinos Burris & G. C. Miller, 1972
- Ergasilus sieboldi Von Nordmann, 1832
- Ergasilus tenax L. S. Roberts, 1965
- Ergasilus turgidus Fraser, 1920
- Ergasilus versicolor C. B. Wilson, 1911
- Ergasilus wareaglei S. K. Johnson, 1971
- Ergasilus wilsoni
