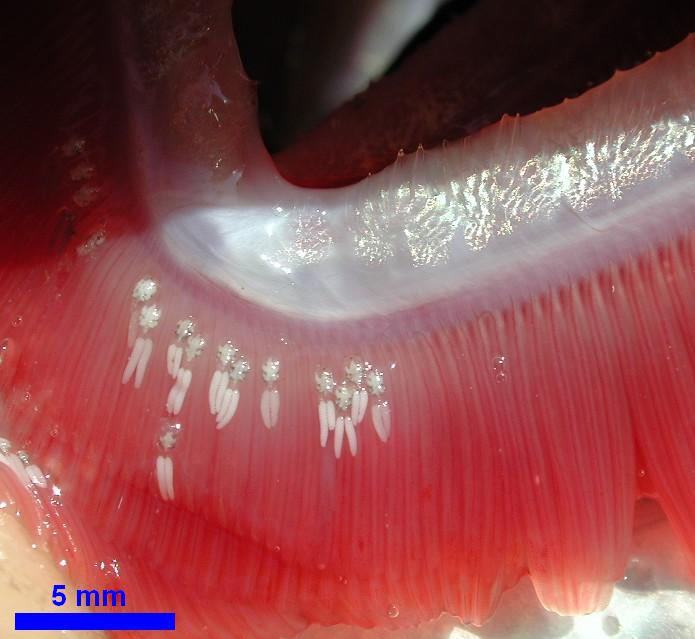
- Ergasilus

Scientific classification
- Kingdom: Animalia
- Phylum: Arthropoda
- Clade: Pancrustacea
- Class: Copepoda
- Order: Cyclopoida
- Suborder: Ergasilida
- Family: Ergasilidae; Von Nordmann, 1832

Synonyms
- Vaigamidae Thatcher & Robertson, 1984

= Ergasilidae =

Family of crustaceans

Ergasilidae is a widespread family of copepods and comprises many species. The type genus is Ergasilus. With a few doubtful exceptions all ergasilids are parasitic on fishes.

== Biology ==
Various species of Ergasilidae parasitise hosts in various habitats, mostly freshwater, but some attack marine species, especially euryhaline fishes such as mullet. Because the best-known species are adapted to attack the gill filaments of the fishes, Ergasilidae are known by common names such as gill lice. However, some species have been found infesting, and presumably causing, external skin lesions of fish.

Immature instars and mature males of Ergasilidae are fairly typical free-living planktonic copepods. The mature females also can swim competently and at least one species, Ergasilus chautauquaensis, is not known to be parasitic at all. However, that is exceptional; most adult females are parasitic and have morphological adaptations for attacking the gills of host species of fishes.

Though their antennules retain their sensory function, the main second antennae of the adult females are adapted to clinging to the gill filaments of host fishes. In many Ergasilus species it is not clear that mature females are able to release their grip once attached, but when forcibly detached from the host's gills they swim without difficulty.

Another adaptation in parasitic females is that their first legs are armed with heavy, blade-like spines, and in some species the joints also are fused, stiffening them and increasing their effectiveness for harvesting host tissue. Once attached to the gills, the females use their first pair of legs to rasp off gill mucus and tissue and move it forward towards the mouth.

In the genus Ergasilus only the adult females are parasitic. The planktonic males do not venture inside fishes, so fertilisation must take place before the females attach themselves to the host's gills.

== Economic significance ==
Since the Ergasilus females attack the gills of fish, a heavy infestation can cause severe damage and secondary infections, interfere with respiration, and sometimes kill the host. In some fisheries and aquacultural enterprises the mortality and morbidity among fish stocks can present serious economic and ecological problems.

== Genera ==
The family Ergasilidae contains the following genera:

- Abergasilus Hewitt, 1978
- Acusicola Cressey, 1970
- Amplexibranchius Thatcher & Paredes, 1985
- Anklobrachius Thatcher, 1999
- Brasergasilus Thatcher & Boeger, 1983
- Dermoergasilus Ho & Do, 1982
- Ergasilus von Nordmann, 1832
- Gamidactylus Thatcher & Boeger, 1984
- Gamispatulus Thatcher & Boeger, 1984
- Gamispinus Thatcher & Boeger, 1984
- Gauchergasilus Montu & Boxshall, 2002
- Majalincola Tang & Kalman, 2008
- Miracetyma Malta, 1993
- Mugilicola Tripathi, 1960
- Neoergasilus Yin, 1956
- Nipergasilus Yamaguti, 1939
- Paeonodes C. B. Wilson, 1944
- Paraergasilus Markevich, 1937
- Pindapixara Malta, 1994
- Prehendorastrus Boeger & Thatcher, 1990
- Pseudovaigamus Amado, Ho & Rocha, 1995
- Rhinergasilus Boeger & Thatcher, 1988
- Sinergasilus Yin, 1949
- Teredophilus Rancurel, 1954
- Therodamas Krøyer, 1863
- Thersitina Norman, 1905
- Vaigamus Thatcher & Robertson, 1984
