= Dioctophymidae =

Scientific classification
- Kingdom: Animalia
- Phylum: Nematoda
- Class: Chromadorea
- Order: Ascaridida
- Family: Dioctophymidae; Railliet, 1915

Synonyms
- Dioctophymatidae Railliet, 1915

Family of roundworms

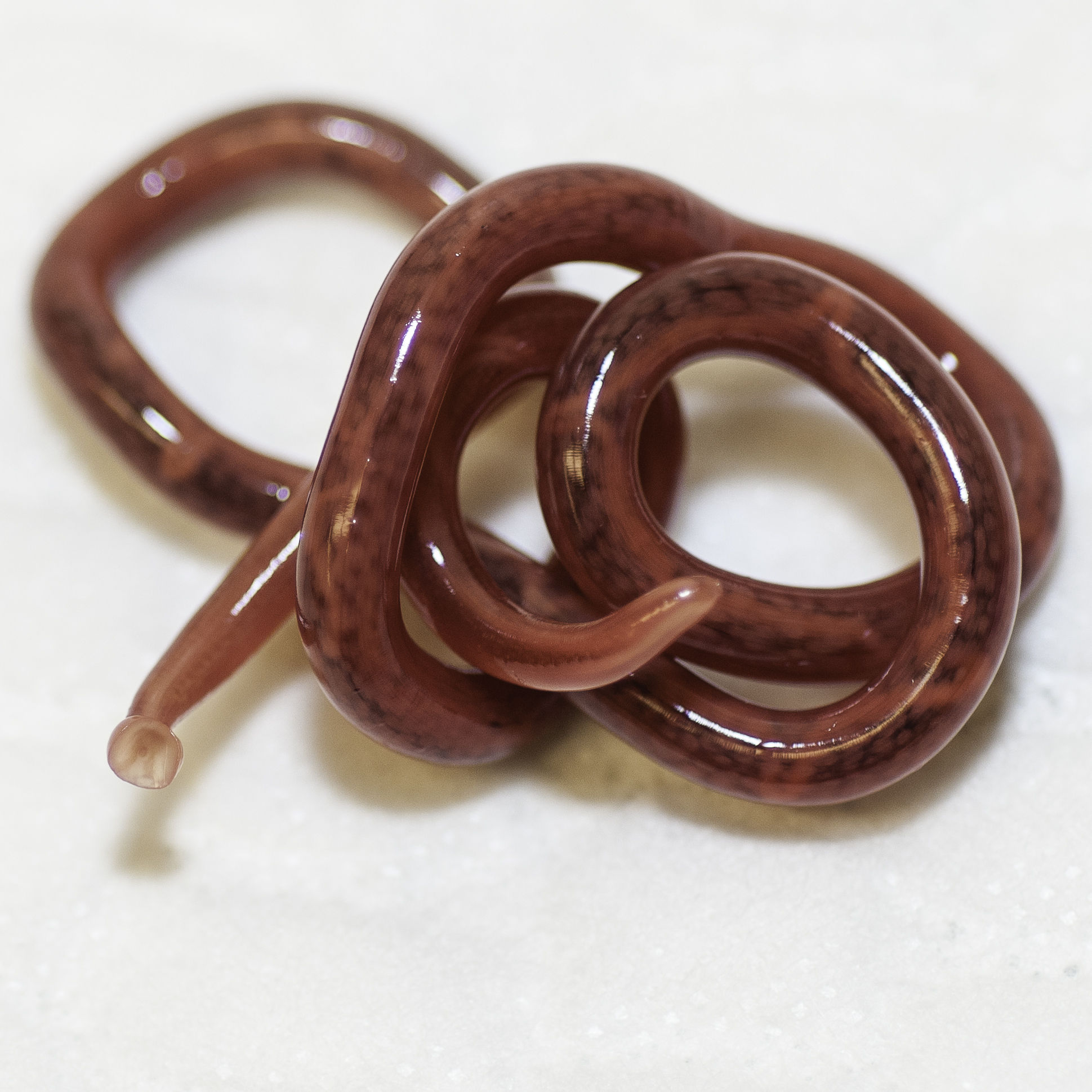
Dioctophyme renale (Giant Kidney Worm)

Dioctophymidae is a family of nematodes belonging to the order Ascaridida. Much older literature uses the alternative spelling "Dioctophymatidae" but this alternative spelling was suppressed by the ICZN in a 1987 ruling.

Genera:

- Dioctophyme Collet-Meygret, 1802
- Eustrongylides Jägerskiöld, 1909
- Hystrichis Dujardin, 1844
- Neostrongyloides Rathore & Nama, 1988
