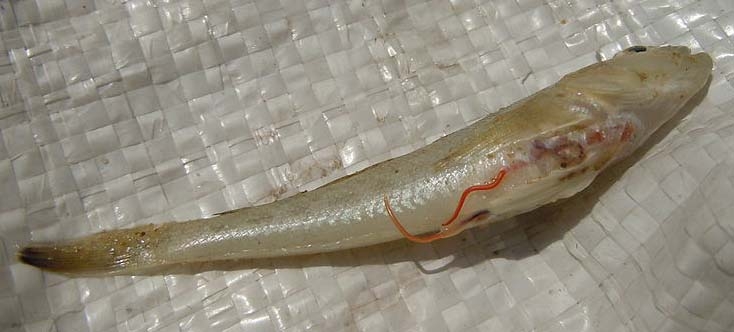

Scientific classification
- Kingdom: Animalia
- Phylum: Nematoda
- Class: Chromadorea
- Order: Ascaridida
- Family: Dioctophymidae
- Genus: Eustrongylides; Jägerskiöld, 1909

= Eustrongylides =

Genus of roundworms

Eustrongylides is a genus of nematodes belonging to the family Dioctophymidae. The species of this genus cause eustrongylidosis. They are often called "large red worms," known for their red or pink color and ability to cause serious disease in both wildlife and humans.

Eustrongylides have a complex indirect life cycle, moving through several aquatic hosts in their lifespan. Piscivorous birds carry the adult worm in their digestive system, and aquatic worms (Oligochaeta) ingest parasitic eggs from bird feces. Freshwater fish then eat the infected worms, and the larvae start to grow in the fish's muscle or body cavity.

Both humans and animals can become parasitic hosts by ingesting infected fish, and eustrongylidosis is a significant cause of mass mortality in wading birds. Infection in humans may lead to intestinal perforation or severe gastritis, which can require surgery.

Cooking or freezing fish to safety standards will effectively kill the larvae, and they are "visible parasites", typically anywhere from 3cm to 11cm long, making them easy to spot during food inspections.

Species:

- Eustrongylides excisus Jägerskiöld, 1909
- Eustrongylides ignotus Jägerskiöld, 1909
- Eustrongylides mergorum (Rudolphi, 1809)
- Eustrongylides papillosus (Rudolphi, 1802)
- Eustrongylides rubrum (Linton, 1892)
- Eustrongylides sinicus Wu & Liu, 1943
- Eustrongylides spinispiculum Rautela & Malhotra, 1984
- Eustrongylides tubifex (Nitzsch & Rudolphi, 1819)
