= Alexander II (statue in Helsinki) =

1894 memorial statue in Finland

Coordinates: 60°10′10.18″N 24°57′08″E

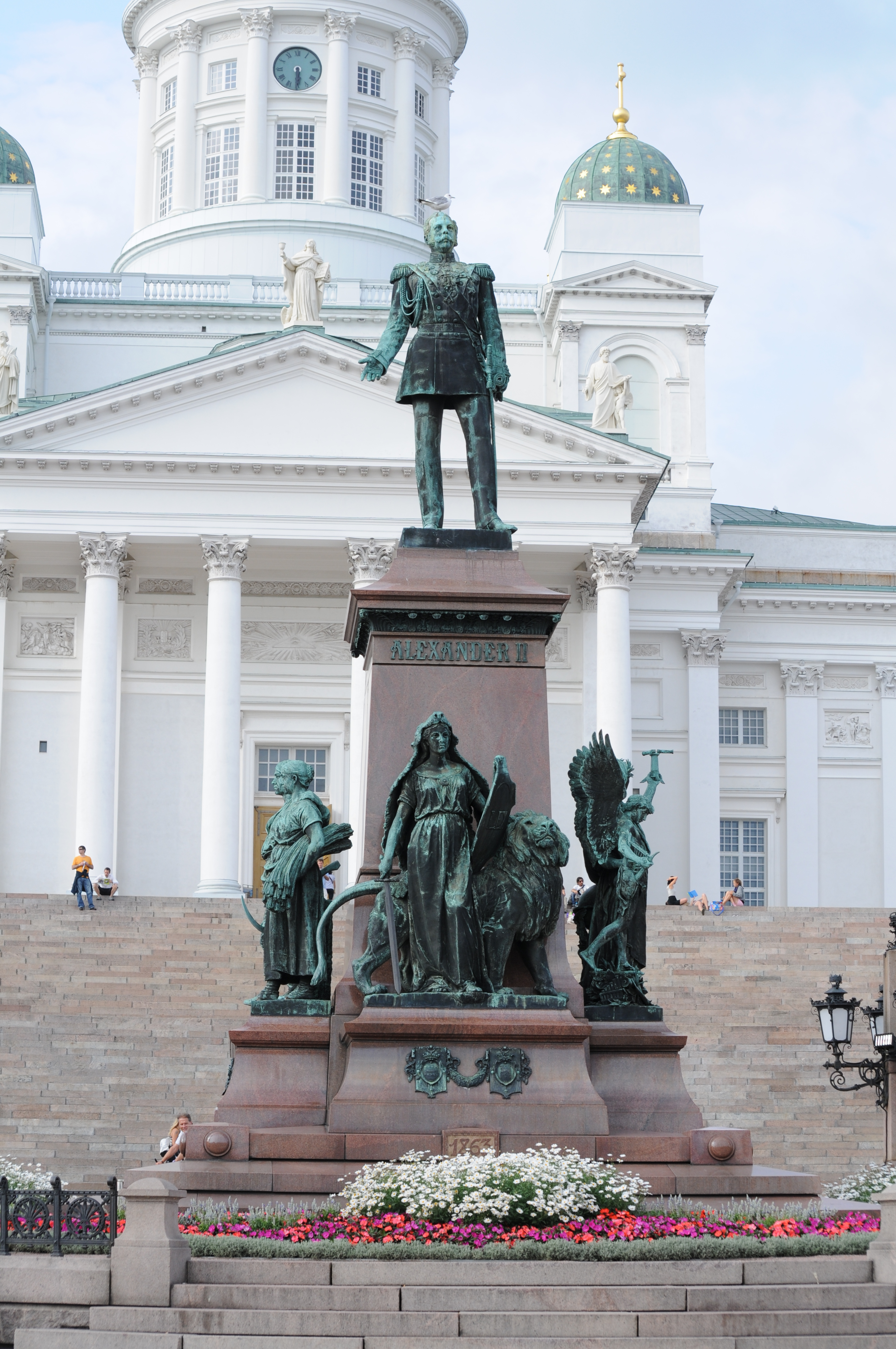
- The statue of Alexander II in front of the Helsinki Cathedral.
- Artist: Johannes Takanen; Walter Runeberg
- Year: April 1894
- Medium: Statue; sculpture
- Subject: Grand Duke of Finland Alexander II
- Location: Helsinki, Finland

Alexander II is a monumental statue located at the Senate Square in central Helsinki, Finland.

The main figure in the statue depicts the Grand Duke of Finland Alexander II giving a speech at the 1863 Diet of Finland that he had assembled, wearing the uniform of an officer of the Finnish Guards' Rifle Battalion. The statue also includes four allegorical sculptures, representing four different virtues - Law (Latin: Lex), Work (Labor), Peace (Pax) and Light (Lux).

Ordered by the Estates and designed by Johannes Takanen (1849–1885) and Walter Runeberg, the monument was unveiled in April 1894. The ceremony was a patriotic demonstration honoring the memory of emperor Alexander II, who was instrumental in establishing Finnish statehood, granting Finnish an official status for the first time in history, and who is remembered by the Finns as a liberal ruler supporting limits on the autocracy of the emperor.

During the Russification of Finland started in 1899 by Nicholas II of Russia - the grandson of Alexander II - the statue became established as the site of anti-Russian demonstrations, remembering Alexander II who had become popularised as the "liberator emperor".

There are currently only two monuments to Alexander II outside Russia on public spaces. The other one is the Monument to the Tsar Liberator in Sofia, the capital of Bulgaria. A sculpture by Mark Antokolsky is located on the courtyard of the Kyiv National Picture Gallery in Kyiv, Ukraine. There is a monumental column in Shevchenko Park, Odesa, Ukraine.

== History ==
=== Context ===
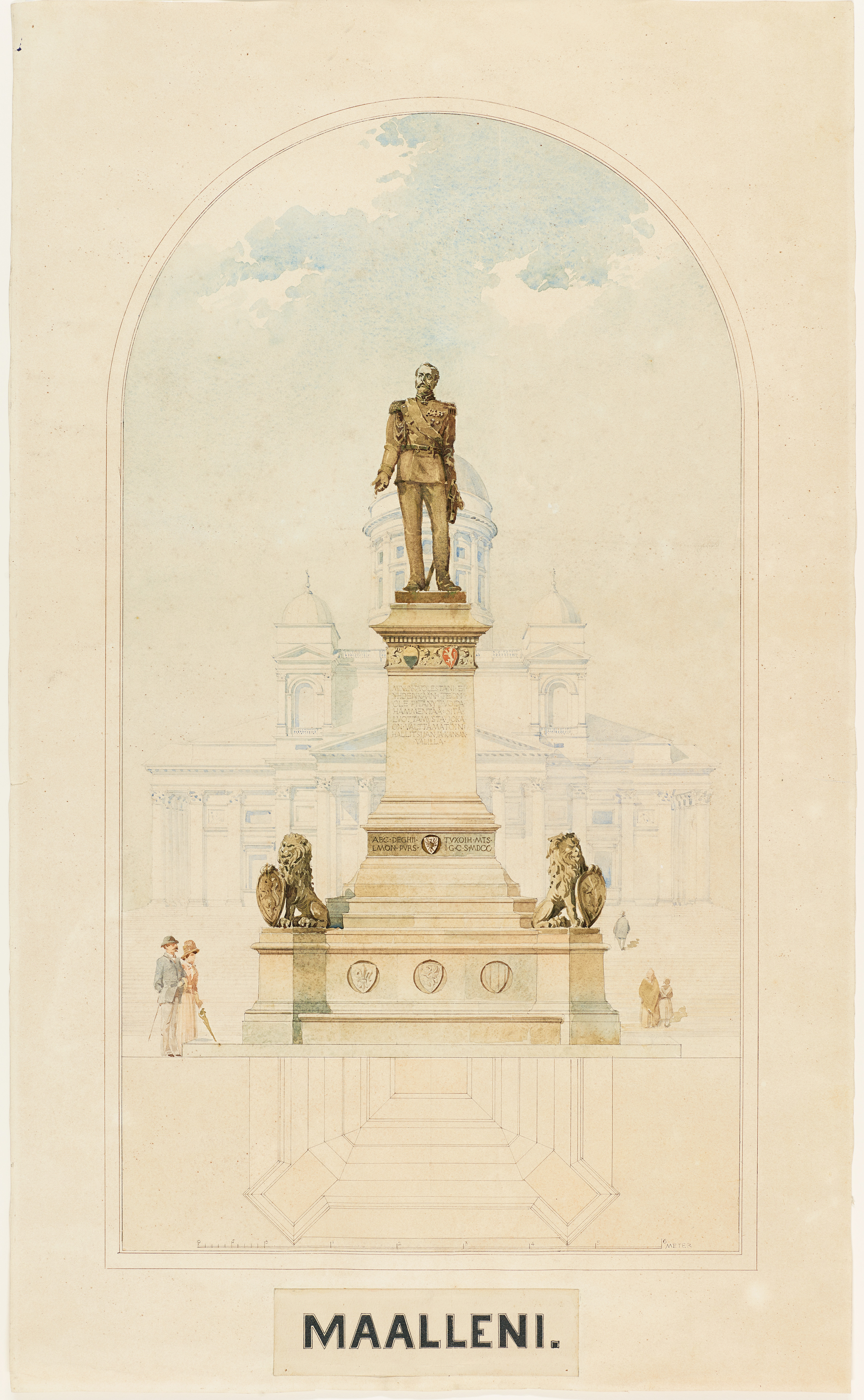
Johannes Takanen's design.

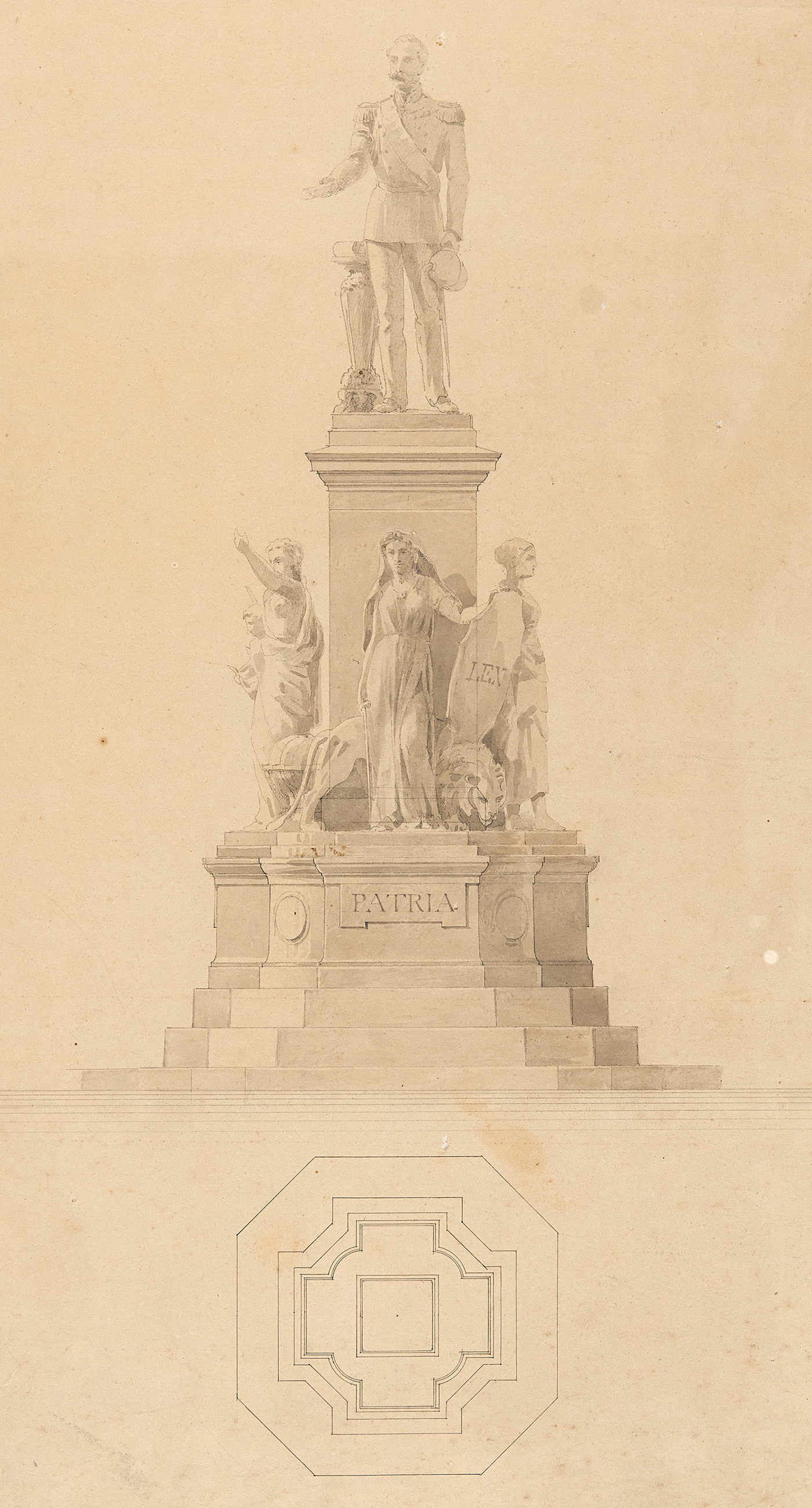
Walter Runeberg's design.

Emperor Alexander II (1818–1881) was a ruler beloved by the Finns, whose reign and influence helped to produce significant societal changes. He died in 1881 as a victim of a bombing assassination, and in 1884 the Diet of Finland held a design contest for a monument placed at the Senate Square. All notable Finnish sculptors at the time were invited to the contest.

This was the first sculpture design contest in Finland. Supported by the estate of the peasants, it was won by Johannes Takanen, with Walter Runeberg at second place, so the board of the contest decided to award the task of the final sculpture to both contestants. However, Johannes Takanen died in 1885, so the task of finishing the sculpture fell entirely on Runeberg, who combined Takanen's ideas with his own.

Placing the statue at its exact location required precise work. According to experts, the statue should be located in the centre of the square in line with the main entrance doors to the Senate and to the University of Helsinki. Thus the matter had to be settled in the City Council of Helsinki, which appointed a 211 square metre space in the centre of the square for the statue.

=== Celebration of the emperor ===
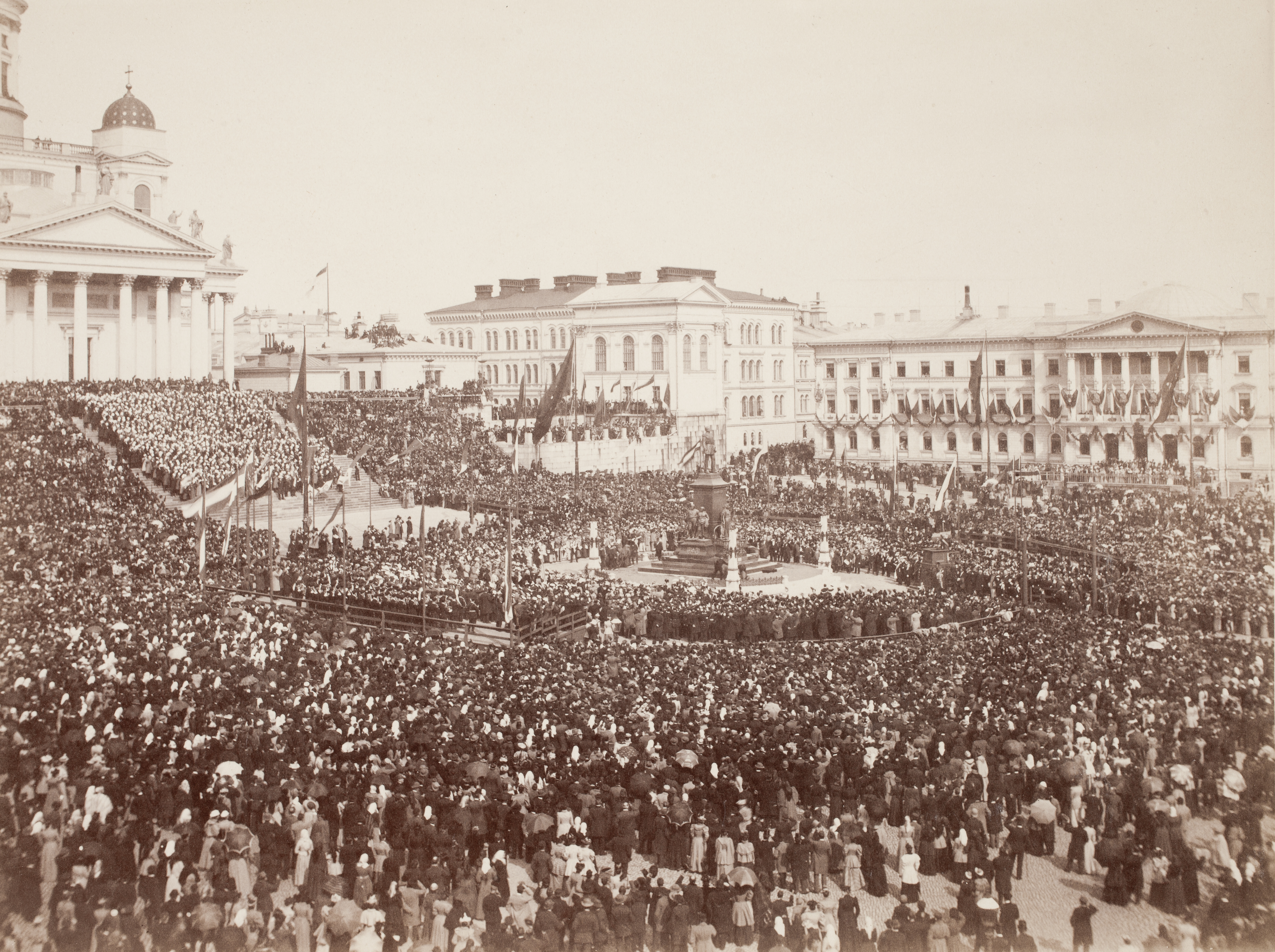
The revelation on 29 April 1894.

The statue was unveiled on the emperor's birthday on 29 April 1894. Newspapers reported in the days before the unveiling that: "the celebration of the emperor has become a common celebration throughout the country. All meaningless bickering has now been cast aside; the entire people now stands as one to show their respect to the memory of the noble emperor."

The day of the unveiling became a widespread patriotic demonstration. Three hundred cities and rural municipalities sent their representatives to the event with floral greetings. The event was attended by 30,000 people (half of the population of Helsinki at the time), and the event was also celebrated in many other places.

== Statue ==
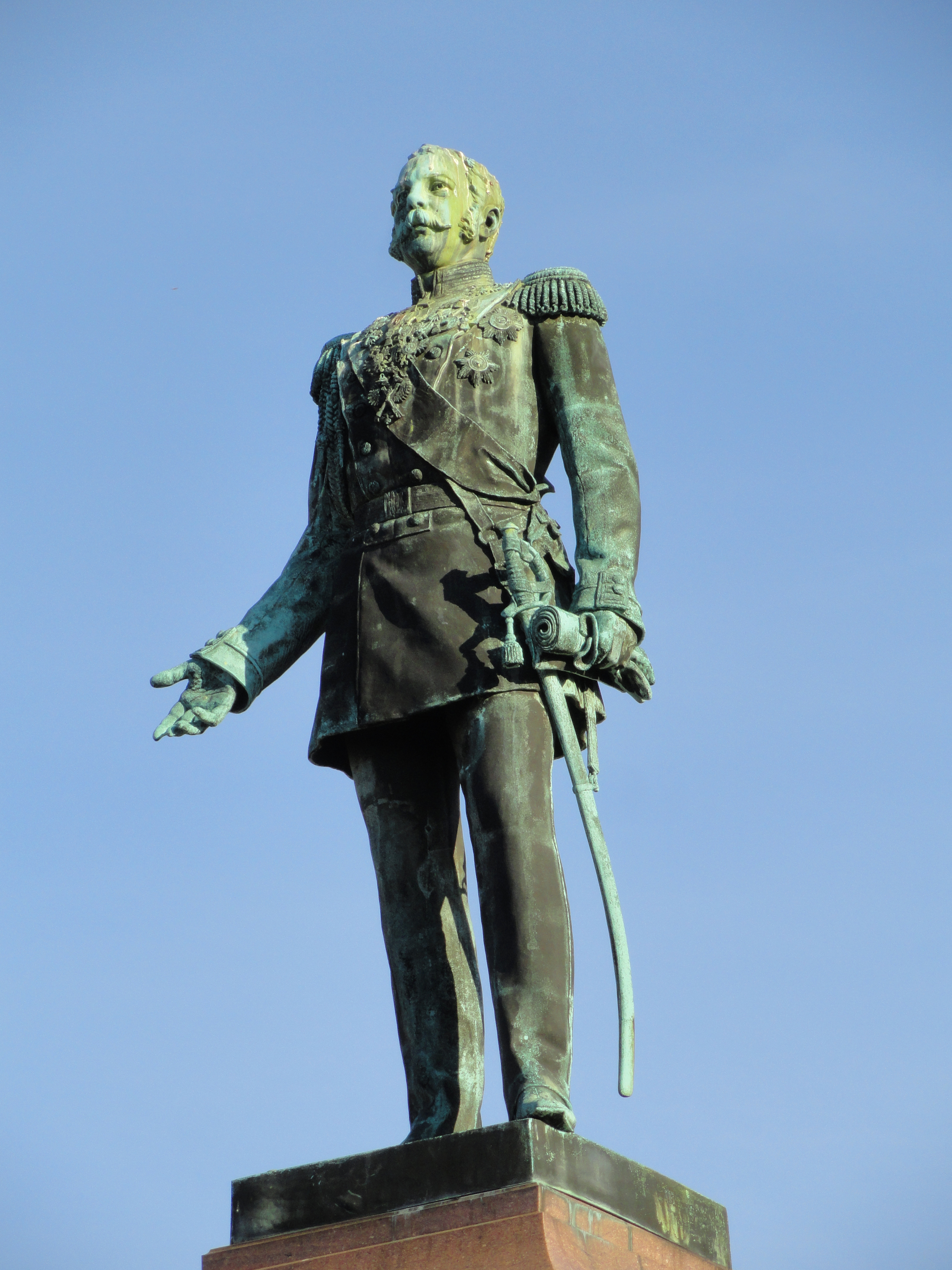
A close-up of the figure of the emperor himself.

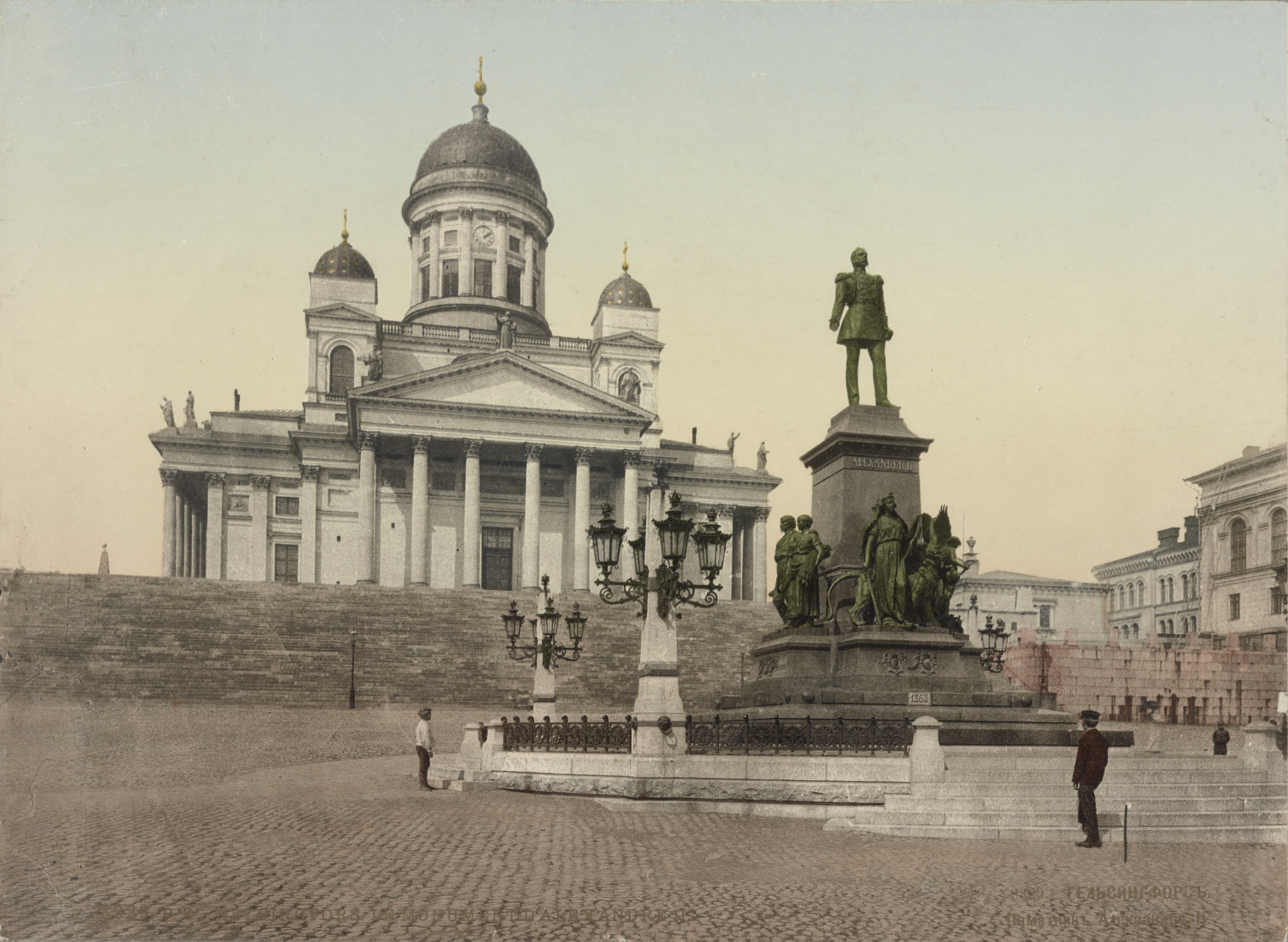
A colour photograph taken between 1890 and 1905.

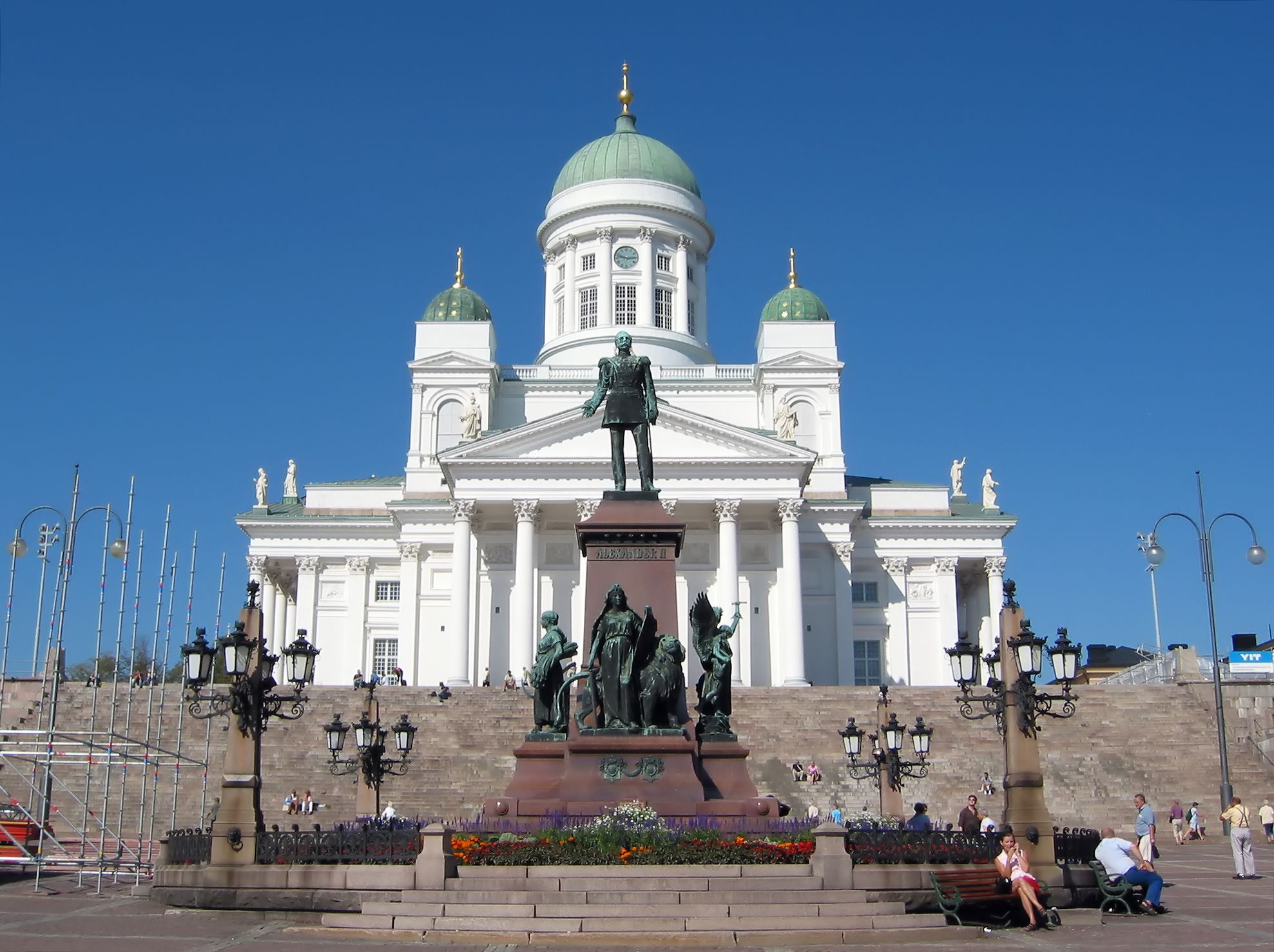
A picture from 2001.

The monument represents realism typical of its era. The bronze statue consists of the figure of Alexander II and four allegorical figures at the base of the sculpture, representing Law (Latin: Lex), Work (Labor), Peace (Pax) and Light (Lux). The pedestal has a total of eight human and animal figures. The figure of Alexander II standing on top of the red granite pedestal is depicted in the uniform of an officer of the Finnish Guards' Rifle Battalion, giving a speech at the 1863 Diet of Finland. As the contest board had liked both Takanen's sketch of the figure of the emperor and Runeberg's ideas for the pedestal figures, Runeberg sculpted the actual statue according to Takanen's sketch, but added the secondary characters he had designed himself and the pedestal to it.

On the southern edge of the pedestal is Law, the goddess of justice with her lions, holding a sword and a shield. On the western edge, facing the main building of the University of Helsinki is Work, a farmer couple, of which the man is holding an axe and the woman is holding a scythe and a wheat bundle. On the northern edge facing the Helsinki Cathedral is Peace, the goddess of peace surrounded by doves. On the eastern edge, facing the Government Palace is Light consisting of two figures: a goddess holding a spectrometer, symbolising science, and a cherub holding a lyre, symbolising the arts.

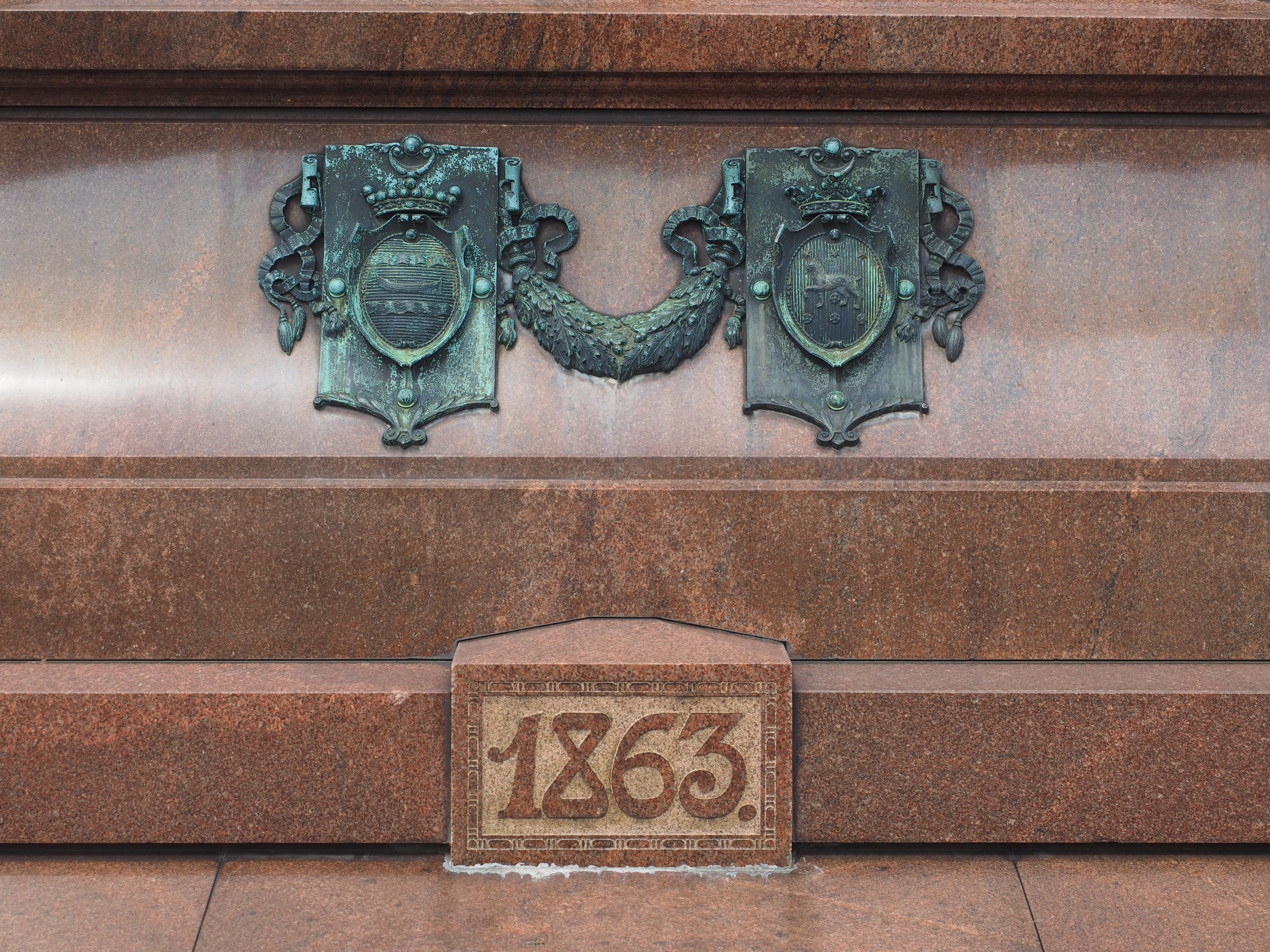
The year 1863 is written on the pedestal of the statue.

The year 1863 written on the pedestal is a reminder of the reinstantiation of the Diet of Finland after a pause of half a century.

Among the ten coats of arms representing the historical regions of Finland is also the coat of arms of Kexholm County depicting a burning castle. Coats of arms on each side of the plinth are oriented geographically: to the south under Lex: Uusimaa and Tavastia; to the west under Labor: Satakunta, Finland Proper and Åland; to the north under Pax: Lapland and Ostrobothnia; and to the east under Lux: Kexholm (current Priozersk in Russia), Savonia and Karelia.

The figure of Alexander II is 3.23 metres tall and the secondary figures at the pedestal are 2.3 metres tall. The total height of the monument is 10.67 metres.

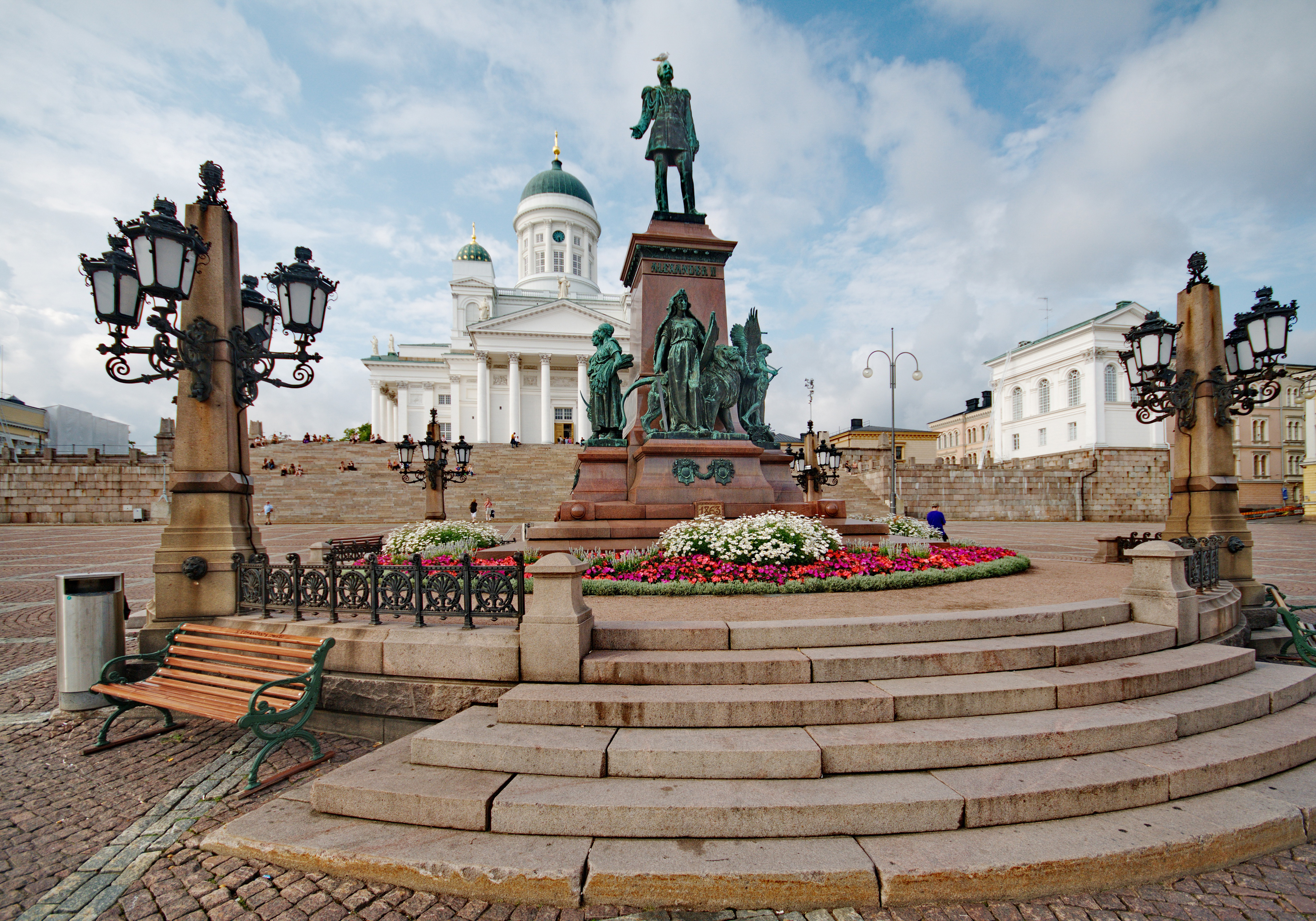
The entire statue.

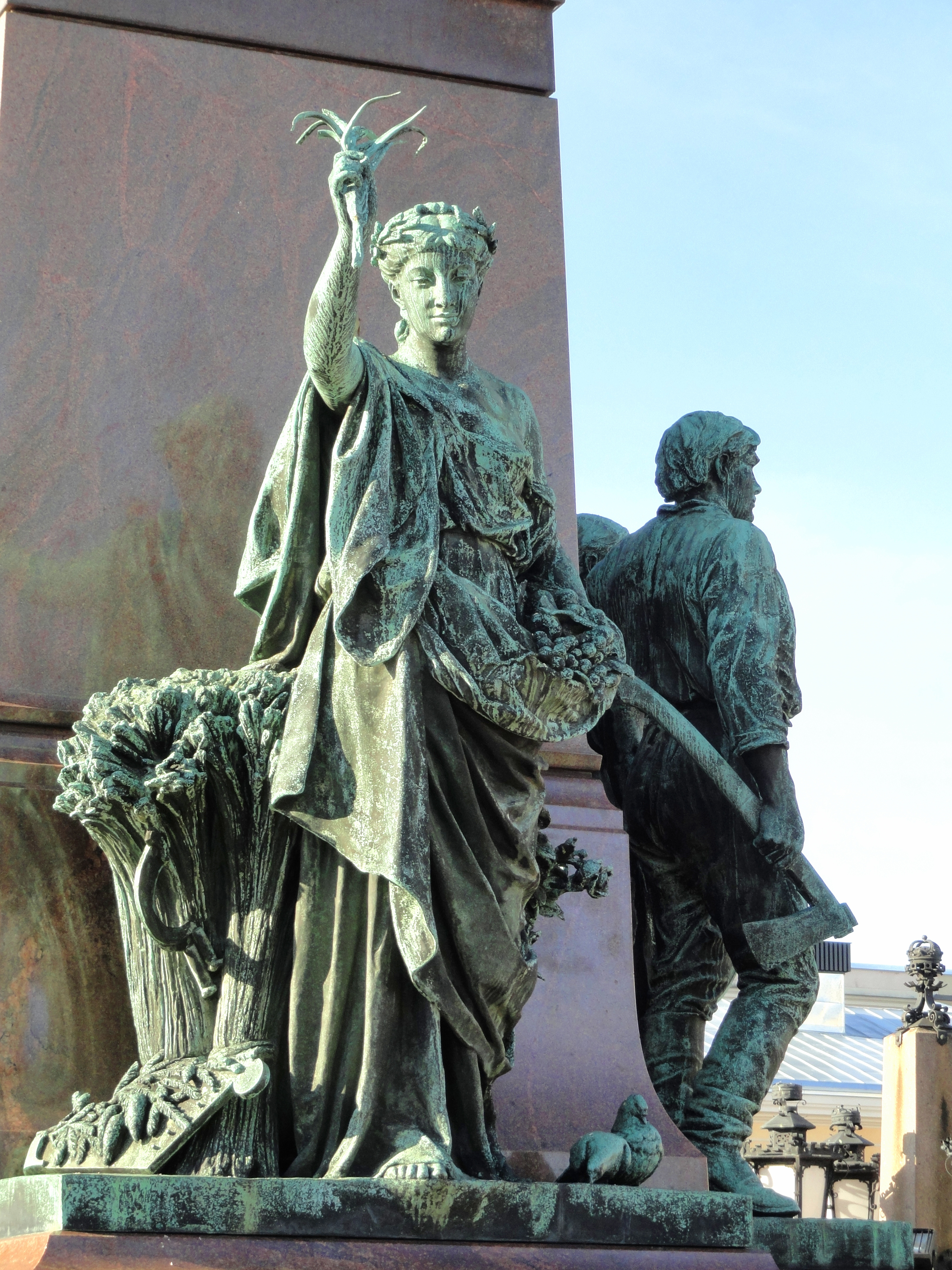
The sculpture Peace on the northern edge of the pedestal.

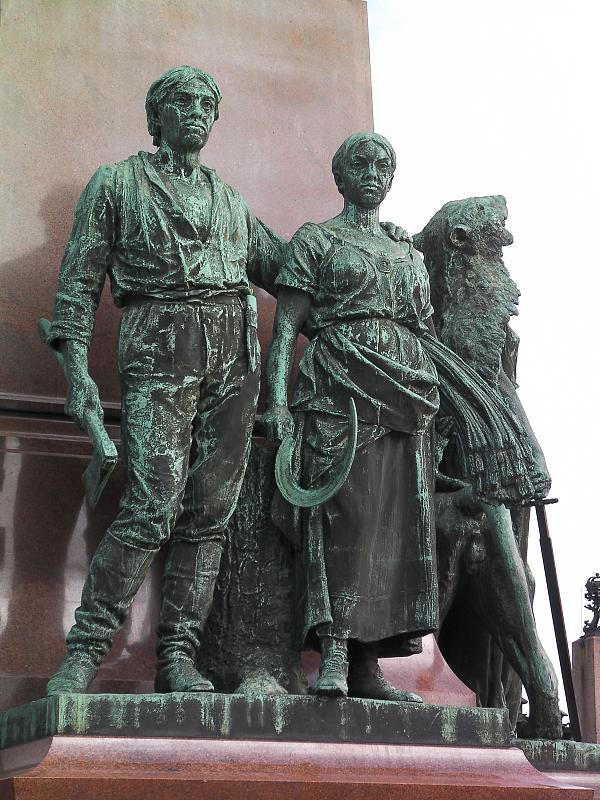
The sculpture Work on the western edge of the pedestal.

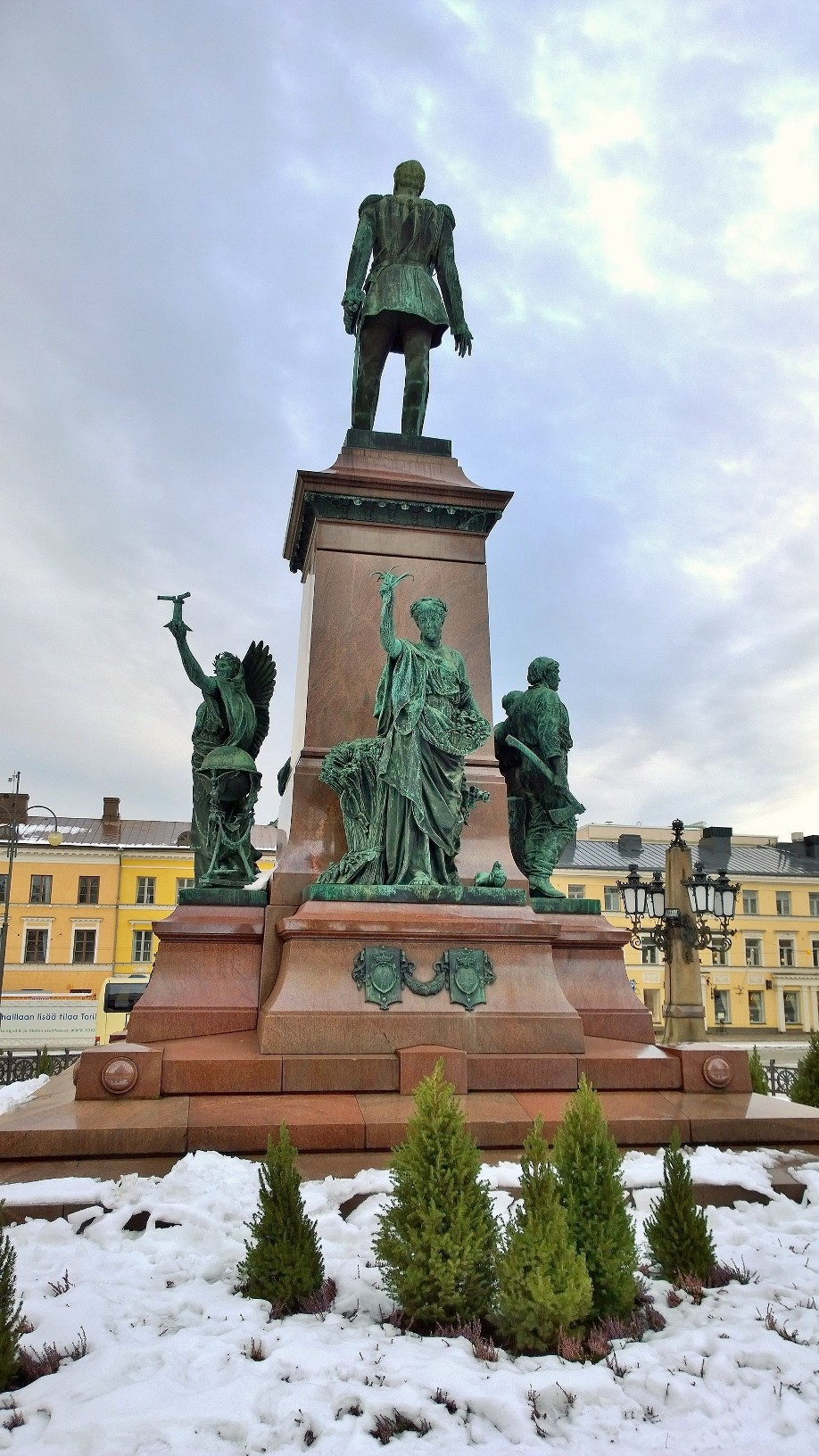
The statue seen from the north.

=== The sculpture Law ===
The most famous part of the monument is the sculpture Law at the pedestal, whose figures have later been interpreted as the Finnish Maiden and the lion of the coat of arms of Finland. A similar female figure clad in a bear skin cape as a personification of Finland had been previously featured at the pedestal of the statue of Johan Ludvig Runeberg sculpted by Walter Runeberg in 1885 at the Esplanadi park in Helsinki.

The statue protecting the constitution at the pedestal of the statue of Alexander II was a politically daring allegory which annoyed the Fennoman movement.

Two gypsum copies were later made of the statue in the same size, of which one was placed in the main stairway of the House of the Estates and the other at the site of the Parliament of Finland at the time, first at the house of the Helsinki voluntary fire brigade and then at the Heinola house. The statue was located in the chamber behind the seat of the speaker. It was originally intended to be located also in the new Parliament House, but it was decided that it should not contain artwork dating to Grand Duchy period. So the Law sculpture of the parliament was moved to the government assembly hall of the Presidential Palace in place of the former throne of the ruler, where it remains to this day. During transport the head of the Finnish Maiden had to be sawn off.

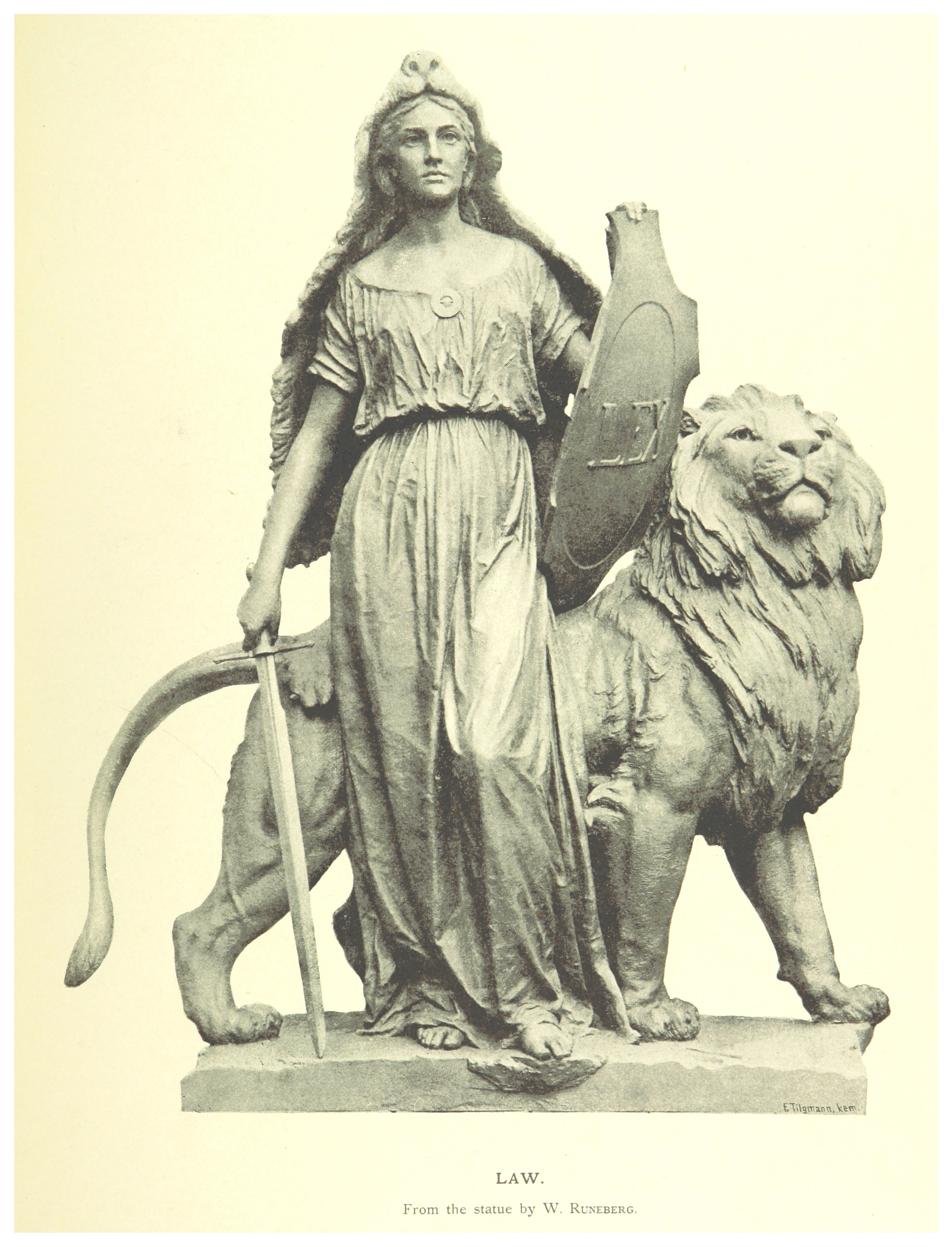
An illustration in the 1893 book Suomi 19:llä vuosisadalla.

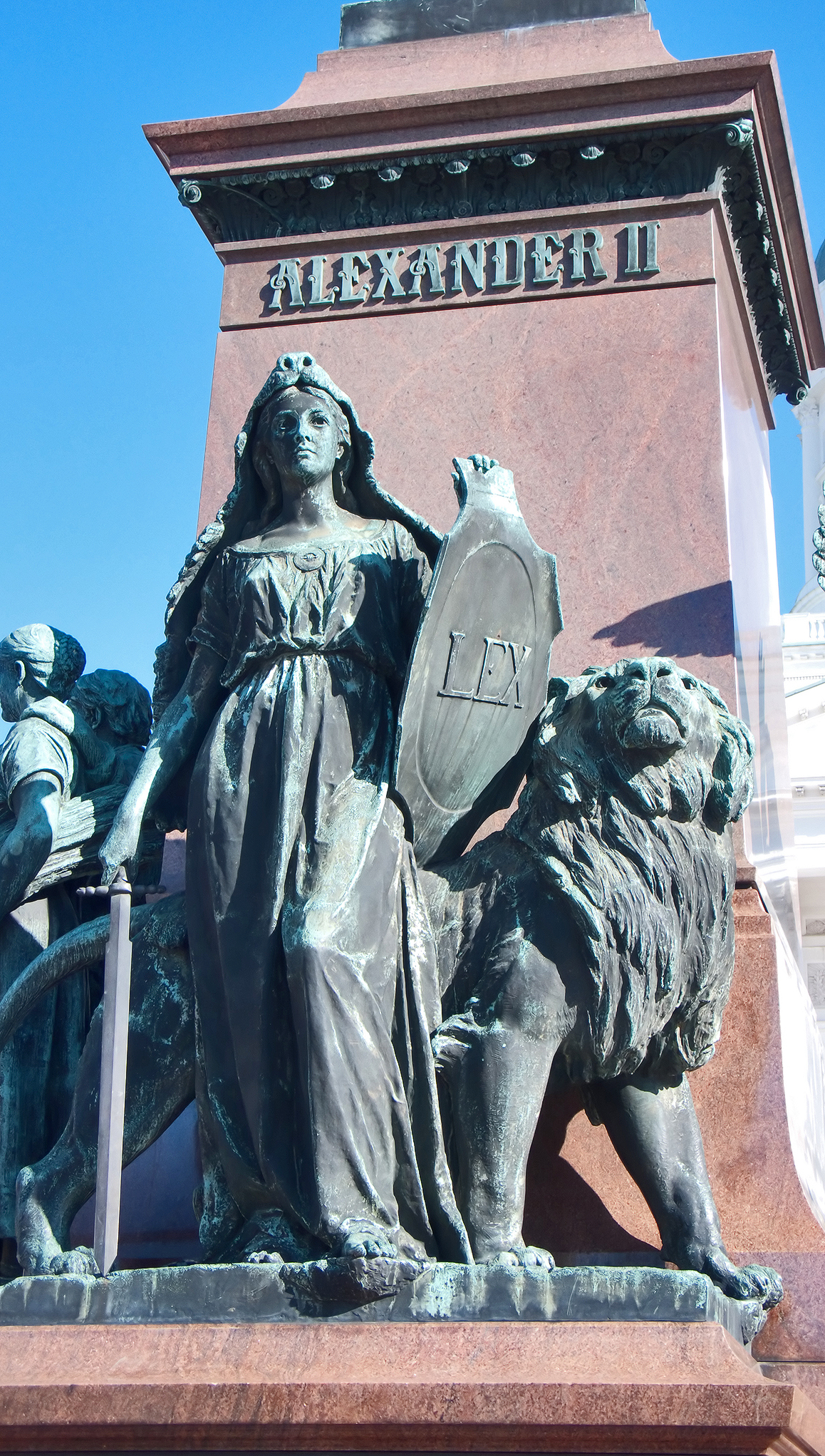
The sculpture Law on the southern side of the pedestal.

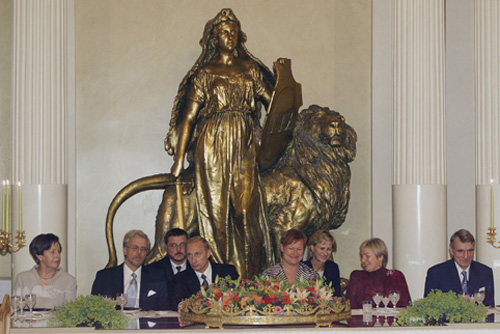
Leaders of the government assembled in the government hall of the Presidential Palace in 2001. In the background is the sculpture Lex by Runeberg.

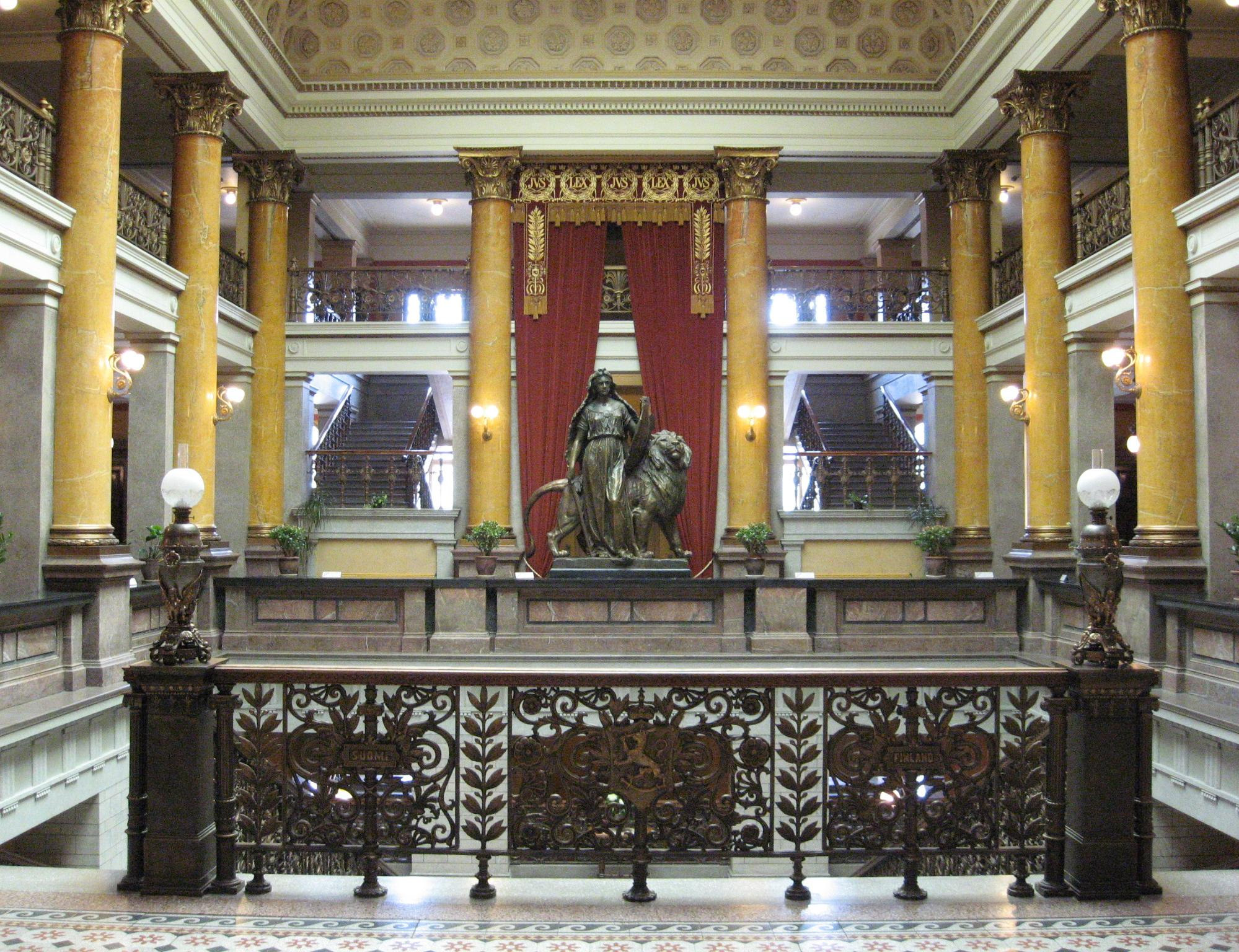
The version of the Lex statue in the House of the Estates.

== Reception ==
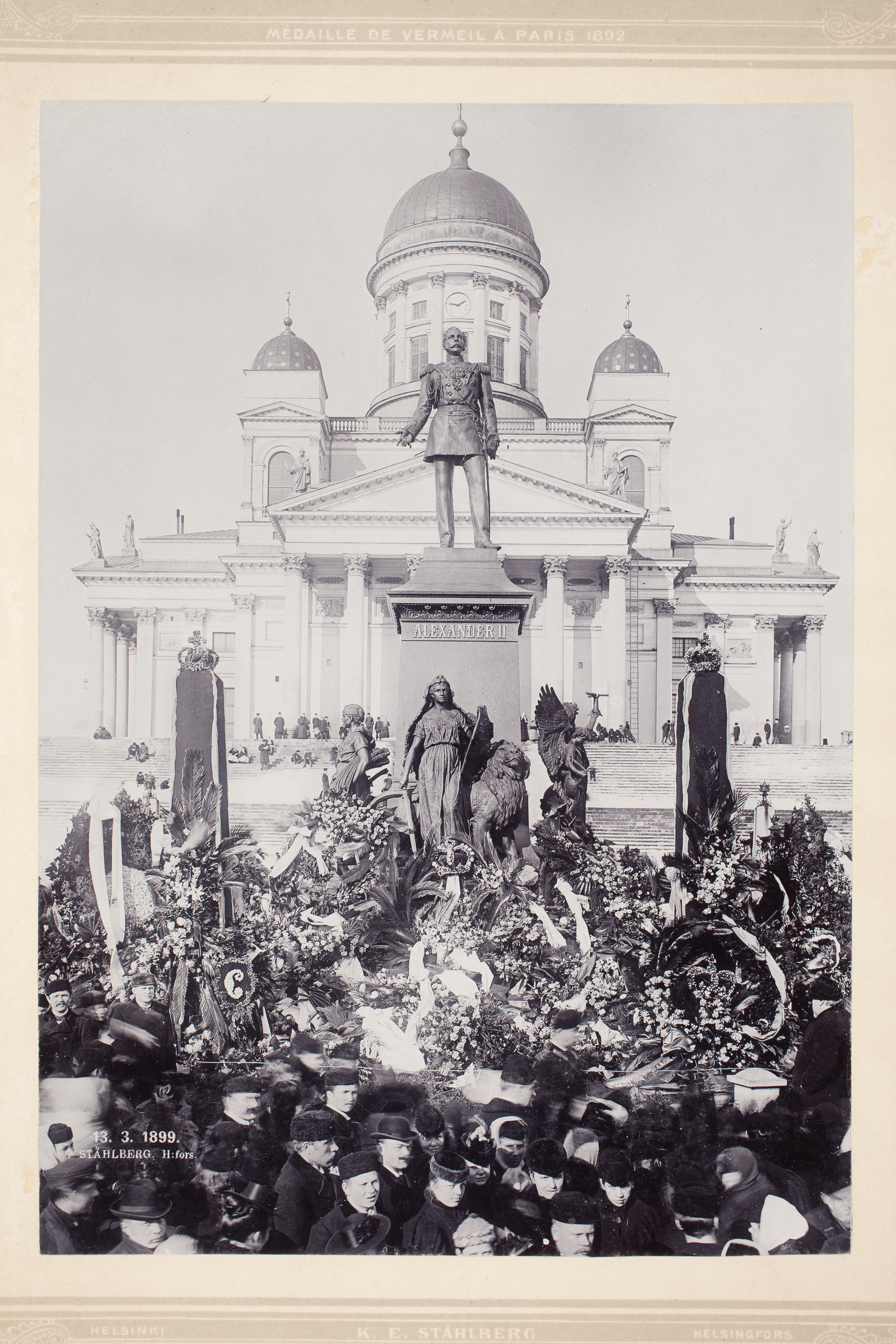
A sea of flowers at the statue of Alexander II on 13 March 1899 to remember the date of the death of the emperor.

As well as the 1894 revelation, the statue of Alexander II also became a stage for large demonstration during the Russification of Finland starting from 1899. Helsinkians protested against the Russification attempts of Nicholas II by placing excessive amounts of flowers on the statue of the "good emperor" Alexander II. Alexander II was made into a popular emperor through posters, postcards and framed photographs of pictures of the statue.

After Finland became fully independent, nationalist movements sought to erase traces of Russian influence in Helsinki. A column published in Uusi Suomi in summer 1918 demanded the removal of the statue of the Russian "conqueror hostile to our fatherland" and that it should be placed in a museum. These demands were not carried out.

In January 1931 the Lapua Movement threatened to remove the monument to the Russian-era Grand Duke. This threat was connected to the Lapua Movement's goal to manipulate the presidential elections by inciting intense nationalism, but this was met with widespread resistance. The press parodied this by saying, that it would be consistent to also remove the picture of king Gustaf III of Sweden from the Vaasa district court and the Per Brahe Statue, the Turku Castle and the Turku Cathedral from Turku as reminders of Swedish rule. In 1935 it was suggested that the statue of Alexander II should be removed from the Senate Square and replaced with a statue of Aleksis Kivi in front of the main building of the university and a statue of Carl Gustaf Emil Mannerheim in front of the Government Palace.

The statue of Alexander II was in group 1 in the protection hierarchy made during the Winter War.

In 1942 high-volume groups of the student body of the University of Helsinki demanded that the statue of Alexander II should be moved away from the Senate Square and replaced with a national statue of liberty. The vandalised bust of Alexander I had previously been removed from the celebration hall of the university, where it had been replaced with a marble relief by Wäinö Aaltonen, later destroyed in the bombing of Helsinki in World War II in 1944. According to Erik Kruskopf "A lot of things were said in that conversation, including that we could perhaps accept a Russian in front of the church seeing as there are twelve Jews on its roof."
