= Malyi =

Malyi (Ukrainian: Малий, meaning "little", "small") may refer to:

- Malyi (surname)
- Mályi, village in northeastern Hungary
- Malyi Bereznyi (border control)
- Malyi Kuchuriv, village in western Ukraine
- Malyi Sasyk Lagoon, lagoon in southern Ukraine
- Malyi Seret, river in western Ukraine
- Cape Malyi Fontan, cape in southern Ukraine

== See also ==
- Maly (disambiguation)
