= Nerubaiske =

Nerubaiske Нерубайське
- Village
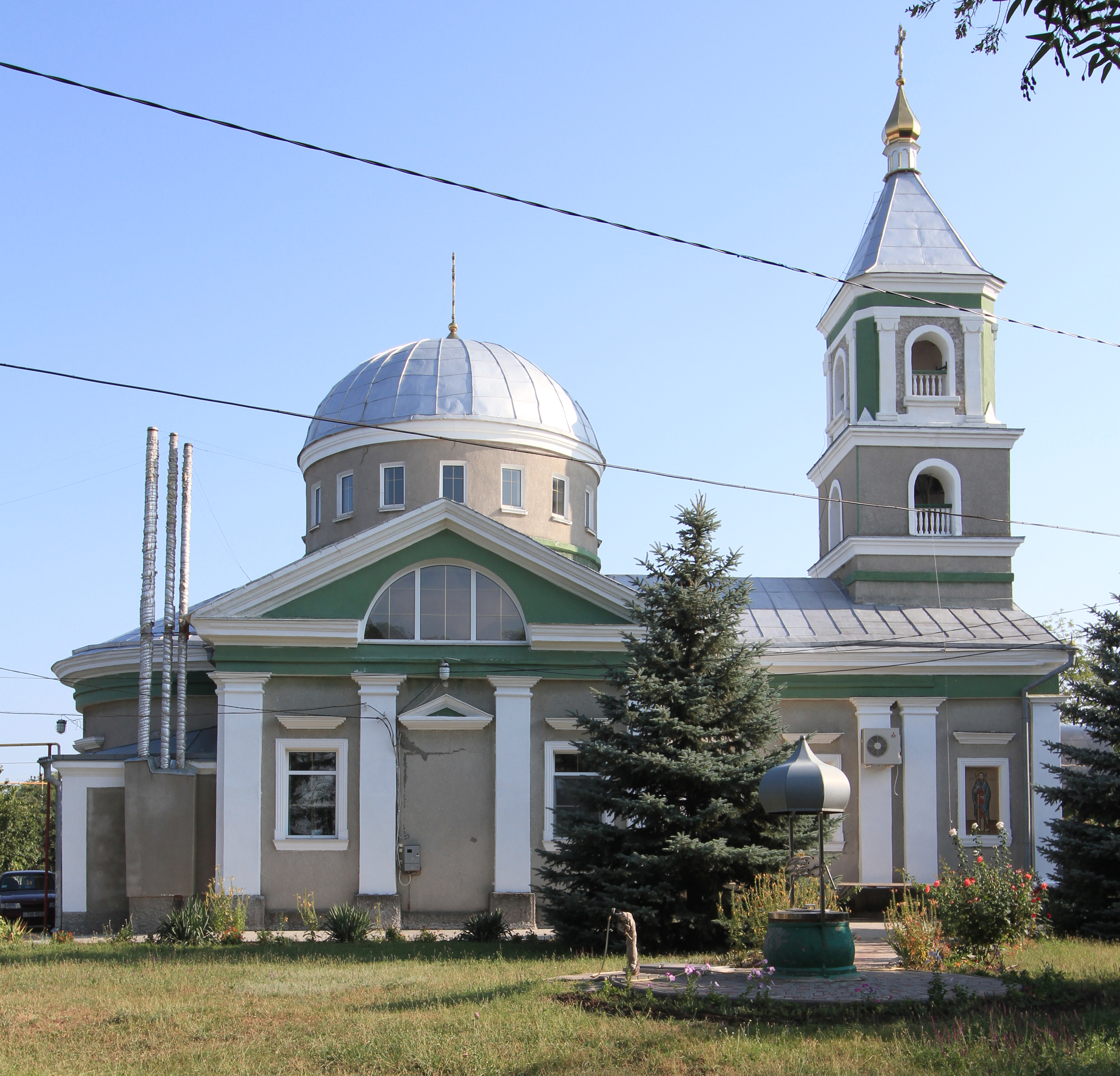
- Church of the Ascension (north facade), Nerubaiske

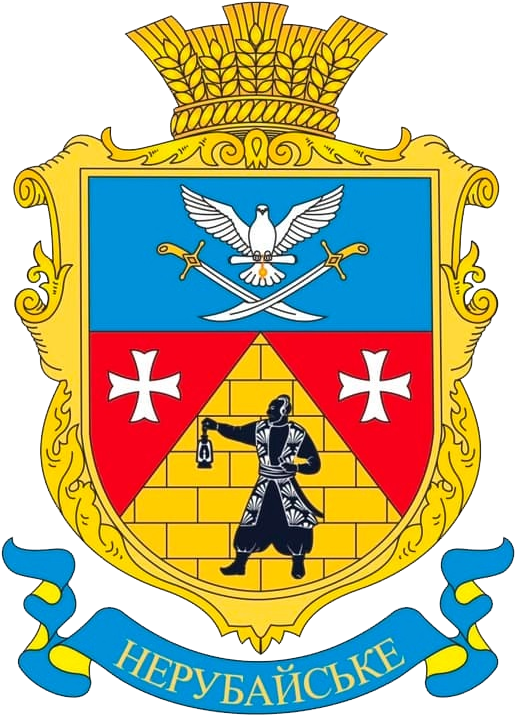
- Flag Seal
- Interactive map of Nerubaiske
- Location within Odesa Oblast Location within Ukraine
- Coordinates: 46°32′48″N 30°37′50″E
- Country: Ukraine
- Oblast: Odesa Oblast
- Raion: Odesa Raion
- Hromada: Nerubaiske rural hromada
- Founded: 1795

Area
  - Total: 8.06 km^{2} (3.11 sq mi)
- Elevation: 40 m (130 ft)

Population (2001)
  - Total: 8,558
- Time zone: UTC+2 (EET)
  - Summer (DST): UTC+3 (EEST)
- Postal code: 67661

Nerubaiske (Ukrainian: Нерубайське) is a village in Odesa Raion of Odesa Oblast in Ukraine. The village is administrative center of the Nerubaiske rural territorial hromada, one of the hromadas of Ukraine. The village's coat of arms is canting.

== History ==
The Slavic name of the village has a transparent form, Nerubaiske, and comes from 'ne rubaty' (not to chop/fight). It is known that in ancient times, Ukrainian Cossacks lived on the territory of the village, as well as on the shores of the Khadzhibey Estuary in general. According to legend, clashes often occurred between the Cossacks and the Turks, who also inhabited this region (hence the Turkic toponyms of the Odesa region, in particular, the name Khadzhibey is of Turkish origin). One day, both sides decided to make peace and, for this purpose, concluded an agreement 'not to slash each other' (ne rubatysya).

The remnants of ancient Cossack necropolises testify to the past presence of the Cossacks. In local cemeteries (there are officially two of them in Nerubaiske), Cossack graves can sometimes be found. The inscriptions on the crosses are written in old Cyrillic. The village itself was founded in 1795. Buildings from the old days have been preserved on its territory: Church of the Ascension with a three-tiered bell tower (in the classicist style), among others.

== See also ==
- List of settlements affected by the Holodomor of 1932–1933 (Odesa region)
