= Altestove =

Altestove Алтестове
- Village
- Interactive map of Altestove
- Location within Odesa Oblast Location within Ukraine
- Coordinates: 46°37′52″N 30°32′54″E
- Country: Ukraine
- Oblast: Odesa Oblast
- Raion: Odesa Raion
- Hromada: Nerubaiske rural hromada
- Founded: 1793

Area
  - Total: 0.468 km^{2} (0.181 sq mi)
- Elevation: 121 m (397 ft)

Population
  - Total: 184
  - Density: 402.13/km^{2} (1,041.5/sq mi)
- Postal code: 67660

Altestove (Ukrainian: Алтестове) is a village in Odesa Raion of Odesa Oblast in Ukraine. Altestove belongs to the Nerubaiske rural territorial hromada, one of the hromadas of Ukraine. The village is located on the shores of the Khadzhibey Estuary, and is about 26 km away from the regional center on the way out of Odesa in the direction of Kyiv. The area of Altestove is 46.8 hectares, there are 88 households, and the population is 184 people (2021).

== History ==
Altestove was founded at the end of the 18th century by immigrants from the western regions of Ukraine.

The plot on which the village is located came into the possession of Andrea Altesti, an official of the Collegium of Foreign Affairs, secretary of the favorite of Catherine II, Platon Zubov. The place for Altesti's plot was chosen by engineer-lieutenant-colonel François de Wollant. In 1802, the city of Odesa bought the village from the landowner Altesti.

The historical and current names of the village come from the names of de Wollant and Altesti: Volanivka, Volyanivka, Devolanivka, Volanovo, Ulyanivka, Altestove, Altesta. On the territory of the village there is a village club, a post office, a grocery store and a private shop — a bar, the village is provided with a central drinking water supply from an artesian well.

== See also ==
- List of settlements affected by the Holodomor of 1932–1933 (Odesa region)
