= Khadjibey =

Fortress by the Gulf of Odesa, Ukraine

- Hacıbey
- Gulf of Odesa
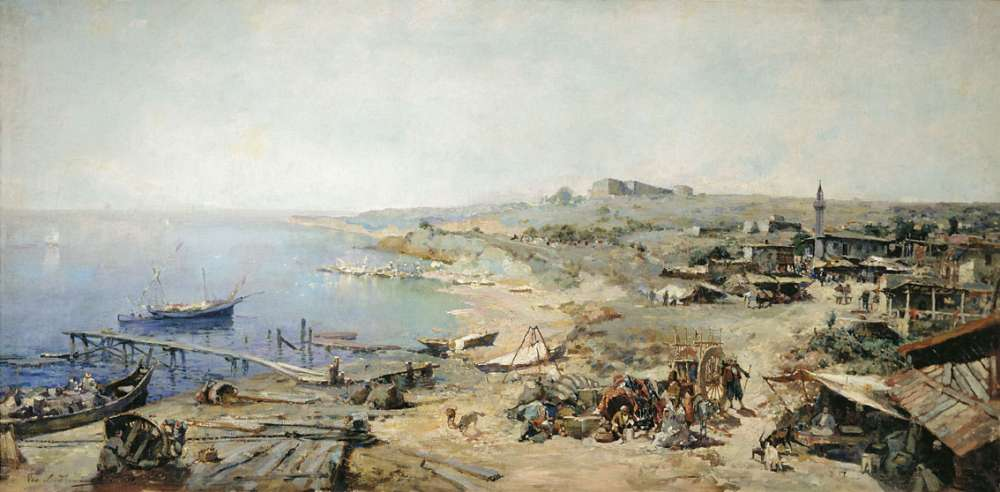
- Khadzhibey by Gennady Ladyzhensky, 1899 (kept in Odesa Art Museum)

Location
- Location in modern Odesa Oblast Khadjibey (Ukraine)
- Coordinates: 46.485722°N 30.743444°E

Site history
- Built: 14th century
- Fate: Replaced by city of Odesa
- Demolished: 18th century

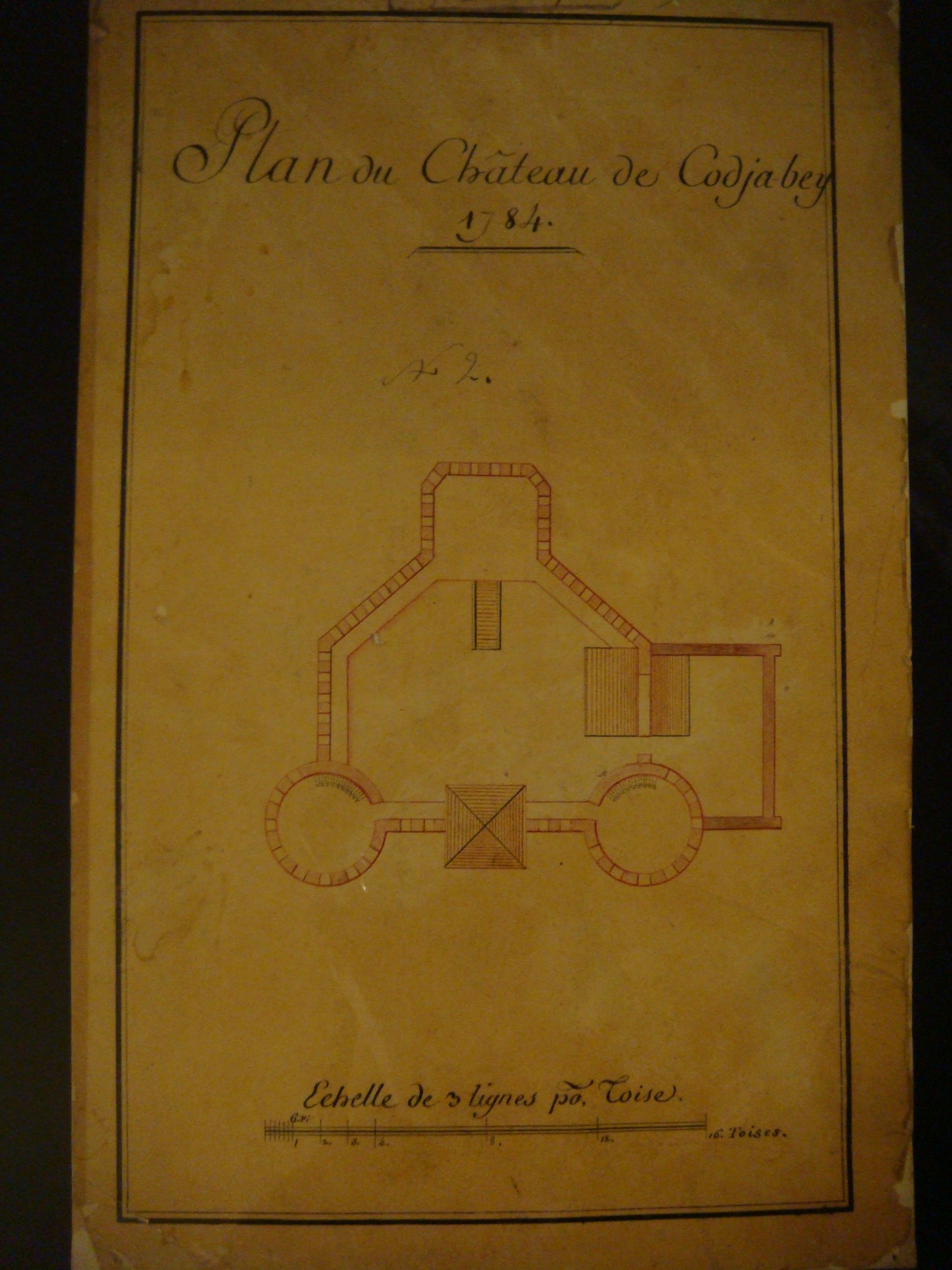
Plan of the fortress, 1784

Khadjibey (Turkish and Crimean Tatar: Hacıbey; (Note: Ottoman Turkish: حَاجِیبَیْ) Ukrainian: Коцюбіїв, Kotsiubijiv) was a fortress and a haven by the Gulf of Odesa, in the location of the modern city of Odesa, Ukraine. The settlement was destroyed and abandoned in the 15th or 16th century and was revived under the Ottoman Empire in the 18th century.

Other known spellings include Codjabey, Gadzhibei, Hacıbey, Hajibey, Hocabey, Kachybey, Khadjibei, Khadzhibey, Kotsiubey, and Kotsiubiiv.

By one hypothesis, it was named after Hacı I Giray. Polish historian Marian Karol Dubiecki suggested the connection of the name of the fortress with the Polish roots linking it with the surname Kociuba, an opinion criticized by Vasili Nadler.

Nadler suggested that a Tatar settlement existed on the site by the 14th century, but was ceded in the early 15th century to the Grand Duchy of Lithuania. An early mention of a "port Kaczubyeiow" dated 1415 is given by Jan Długosz in his Historiae Polonicae. However, it has been argued that Długosz erred and that the described events (the gift of grain by King Władysław II Jagiełło to a besieged Constantinople) are reliably documented to have happened in 1413.

In 1480, the fortress was captured by the Ottoman Empire. In 1764, the Ottomans reinforced their position by building the Yeni Dünya fortress nearby; the area was included in the province of Silistra Eyalet. The Russian army took the fortress and settlement in 1789 during the Russo-Turkish War, a battle was fought near Khadjibey in 1790, and, in 1792, the territory was annexed by the Russian Empire.

In August 2025, archaeologists excavated the remains of the fortress's artillery battery under the Prymorskyi Boulevard. In August 2026, the foundations of a tower were found as well. The tower was polygonal (despite old plans depicting the towers as round), had a diameter of up to 8 m, and its walls were 2.5 m thick. The size of the entire fortress is estimated to be 32×37 m.

== See also ==
- Khadzhibey Estuary
