= Kholodna Balka =

Kholodna Balka Холодна Балка
- Village
- Flag Seal
- Interactive map of Kholodna Balka
- Location within Odesa Oblast Location within Ukraine
- Coordinates: 46°36′15″N 30°35′14″E
- Country: Ukraine
- Oblast: Odesa Oblast
- Raion: Odesa Raion
- Hromada: Nerubaiske rural hromada
- Founded: 1792

Area
  - Total: 3.17 km^{2} (1.22 sq mi)

Population (2001)
  - Total: 2,582
- Postal code: 67660
- Website: http://frozen-balka.ucoz.ua/

Kholodna Balka (Ukrainian: Холодна Балка) is a village in Odesa Raion of Odesa Oblast in Ukraine. Kholodna Balka belongs to the Nerubaiske rural territorial hromada, one of the hromadas of Ukraine. The village is located on the shore of the Khadzhibey Estuary. The distance to Odesa is 25 km, and the nearest railway station, Dachne, is five kilometers away. Until July 17, 2020, the village was part of the Biliaivka Raion in the Odesa Oblast.

== History ==
=== Foundation. Origin of the name ===
In 1792, Chancellery Councilor and Cavalier Andrey Altesti received land and founded the village of Kholodna Balka. In 1793, Andrey Altesti obtained permission to build a church in honor of Saint Nicholas, but the church was never built.

The name of the village of Kholodna Balka (literally "Cold Ravine") is related to the fact that cold air lingers in the lower reaches of ravines and gullies. Until 1917, the village was part of the Odesa City Governorate.

During the Soviet-engineered Holodomor of 1932–1933, at least 9 residents of the village died.

== See also ==
- List of settlements affected by the Holodomor of 1932–1933 (Odesa region)
