= Odesa Quarantine =

Wall in Odesa, Ukraine

- Одеський карантин
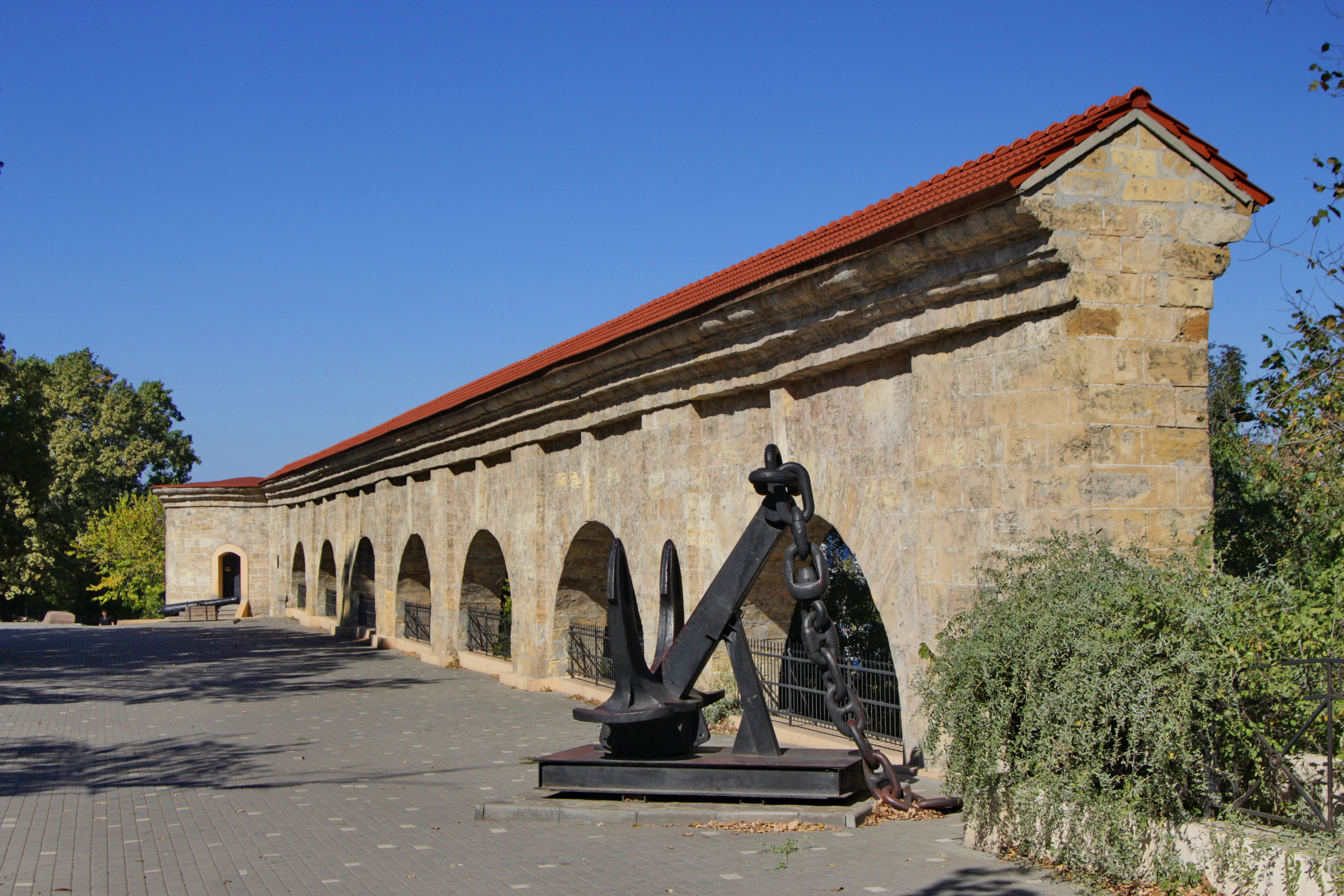

- Location within Odesa Oblast Odesa Quarantine (Ukraine)
- Alternative names: Quarantine Walls

General information
- Location: Odesa, Ukraine
- Coordinates: 46°28′56″N 30°45′17″E
- Year built: 1793

The Odesa Quarantine (Ukrainian: Одеський карантин, romanized: Odeskyi karantyn) is a lazaretto located on Cape Langeron in the city of Odesa, Ukraine. Located adjacent to Shevchenko Park, the structure was historically used for preventing the spread of plague before being largely demolished in the late 19th century.

== History ==
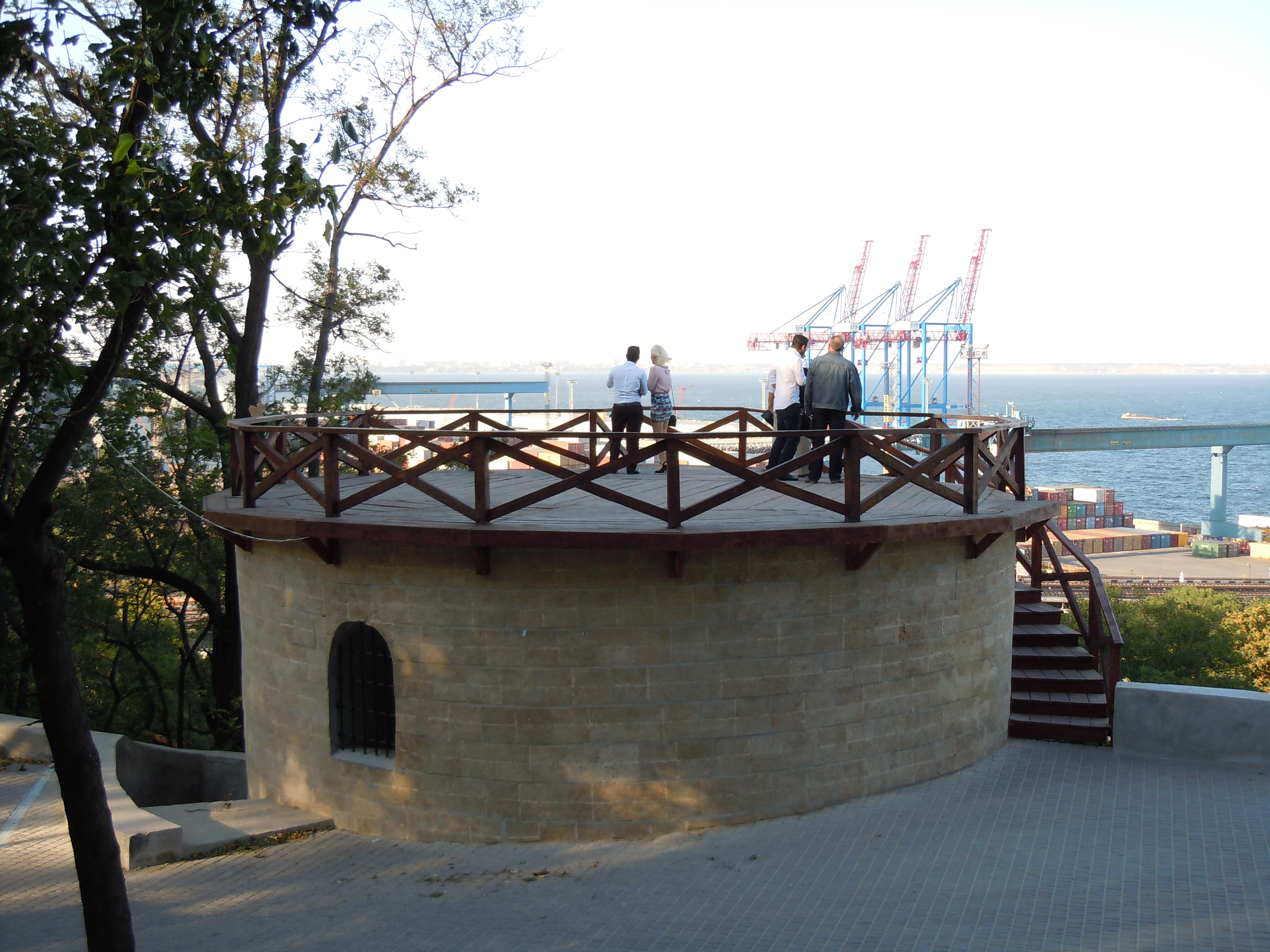
Watch Tower was formerly used as the morgue of the Quarantine Cemetery

The modern Odesa Quarantine was established in 1811 on the basis of the Odesa Fortress, a defence line which had been constructed in 1793. The establishment of the Quarantine coincided with a plague outbreak, and it was established under the guidance of Armand Emmanuel de Vignerot du Plessis, 5th Duke of Richelieu. The original quarantine was built alongside the Port of Odesa by François Sainte de Wollant. It was at first very successful, but its wooden structure soon proved to be unable to cope with the increasing development of the city, and the quarantine was moved.

Following its establishment, the quarantine was subject to criticism by merchants, with a British consul noting that "the real and ostensible evil has been the necessity for restraints to intercourse and business." Quarantine laws were later loosened and temporarily abolished during the Crimean War, but would frequently be reinstated as part of protectionist policies. Following the abolition of quarantine laws and the transfer of quarantine functions to hospitals, the Odesa Quarantine was largely demolished in 1896. The powder tower, the arcade, and a partially-intact tower of the Quarantine Cemetery have survived from the original structure. The quarantine was later a site for executions of participants in the Russian Revolution of 1905.

The Quarantine Cemetery was destroyed in 1936 and Chornomorets Stadium was built over its place. Other threats to the quarantine's existence include the development of Trams in Odesa. Beginning in 2014, the local government of Odesa has made efforts to restore the quarantine's appearance. Cannons from the Russo-Turkish War of 1877–1878 have also been placed on the quarantine for decorative purposes.
