= North Odesa Cape =

Northern point of Gulf of Odesa

North Odesa Cape Мис Е
- Cape
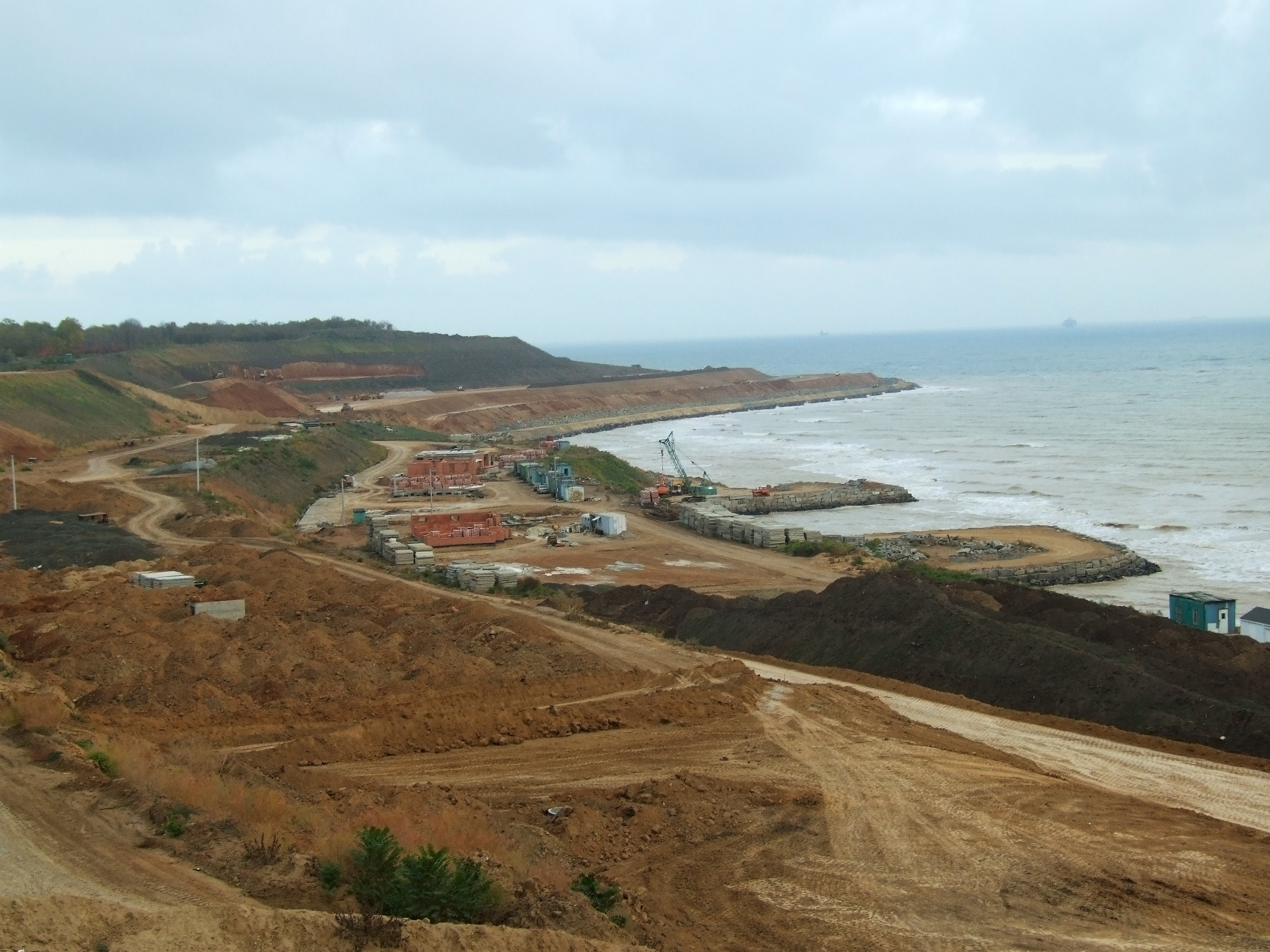
- Cape E in Lisky village

- Location within Odesa Oblast Location within Ukraine
- Coordinates: 46°32′56″N 30°49′13″E
- Location: Odesa, Ukraine
- Water bodies: Gulf of Odesa

North Odesa Cape, or Cape E (Ukrainian: мис Е, Північний Одеський), is a northern point of the Gulf of Odesa. The cape is located on the coast between the villages Lisky and Fontanka of the Odesa Oblast.
