= Nerubaiske rural hromada =

Coordinates: 46°32′48″N 30°37′30″E

Nerubaiske rural territorial hromada Нерубайська сільська територіальна громада
- Hromada
- Interactive map of Nerubaiske rural territorial hromada
- Country: Ukraine
- Oblast: Odesa Oblast
- Raion: Odesa Raion
- Admin. center: Nerubaiske

Area
  - Total: 97.5 km^{2} (37.6 sq mi)

Population (2026)
  - Total: 12,606
  - Density: 129/km^{2} (335/sq mi)
- CATOTTG code: UA51100230000045500
- Settlements: 5
- Rural settlements: 1
- Villages: 4
- Website: https://nerubayska-gromada.gov.ua/

Nerubaiske rural territorial hromada (Ukrainian: Нерубайська сільська територіальна громада) is a hromada of Ukraine, located in Odesa Raion, Odesa Oblast. Its administrative center is the village Nerubaiske. Formed on July 17, 2020, as a result of the merger of Nerubaiske and Kholodnobalkivska village councils.

The hromada has a population of 12,606 people, and includes one settlement, Usatove, and 4 villages:

- Altestove
- Kholodna Balka
- Nerubaiske
- Velyka Balka
