= Shevchenko Park (Odesa) =

Park in Odesa, Ukraine

Coordinates: 46.4789°N 30.7533°E

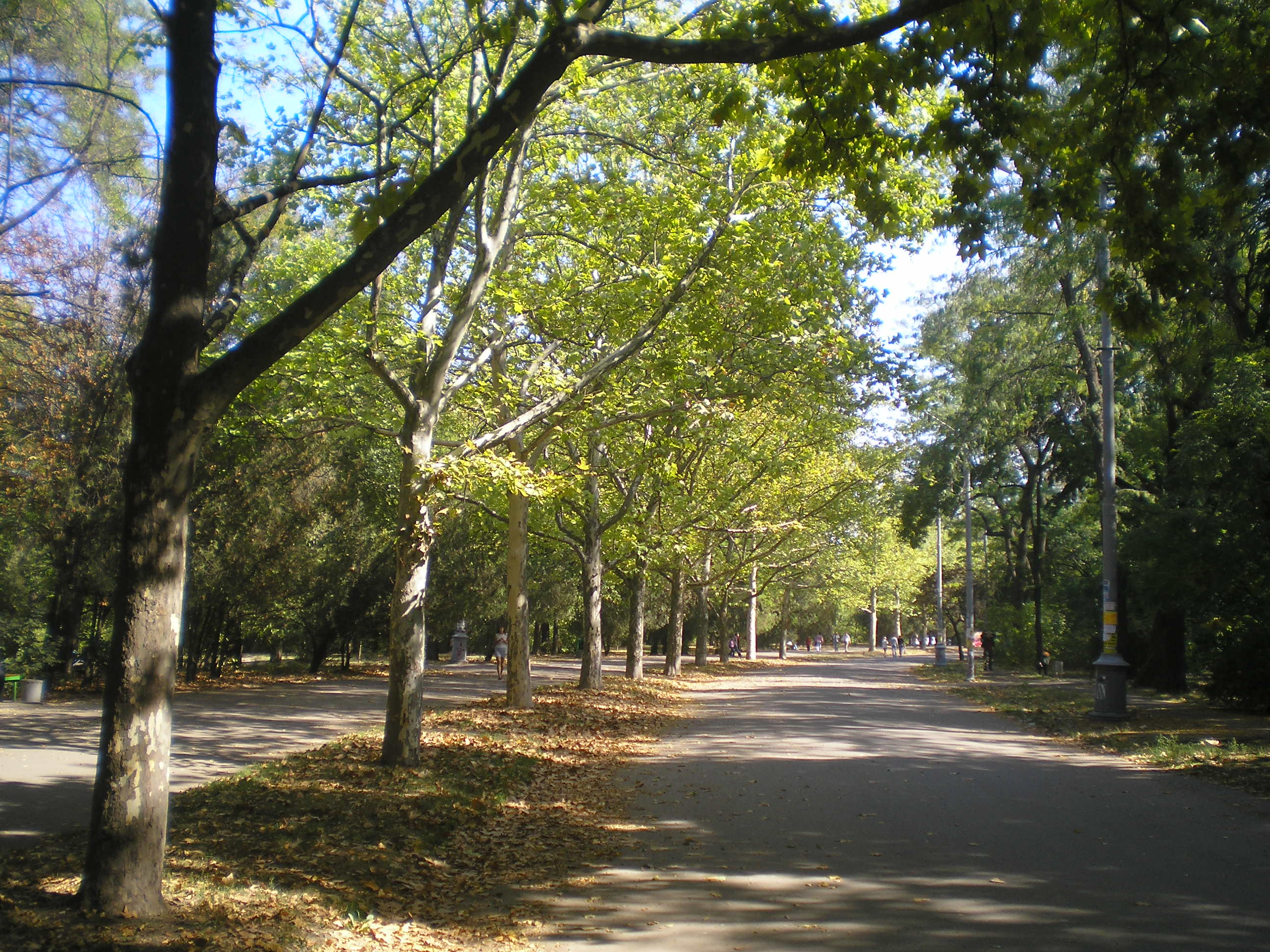
Park's central alley

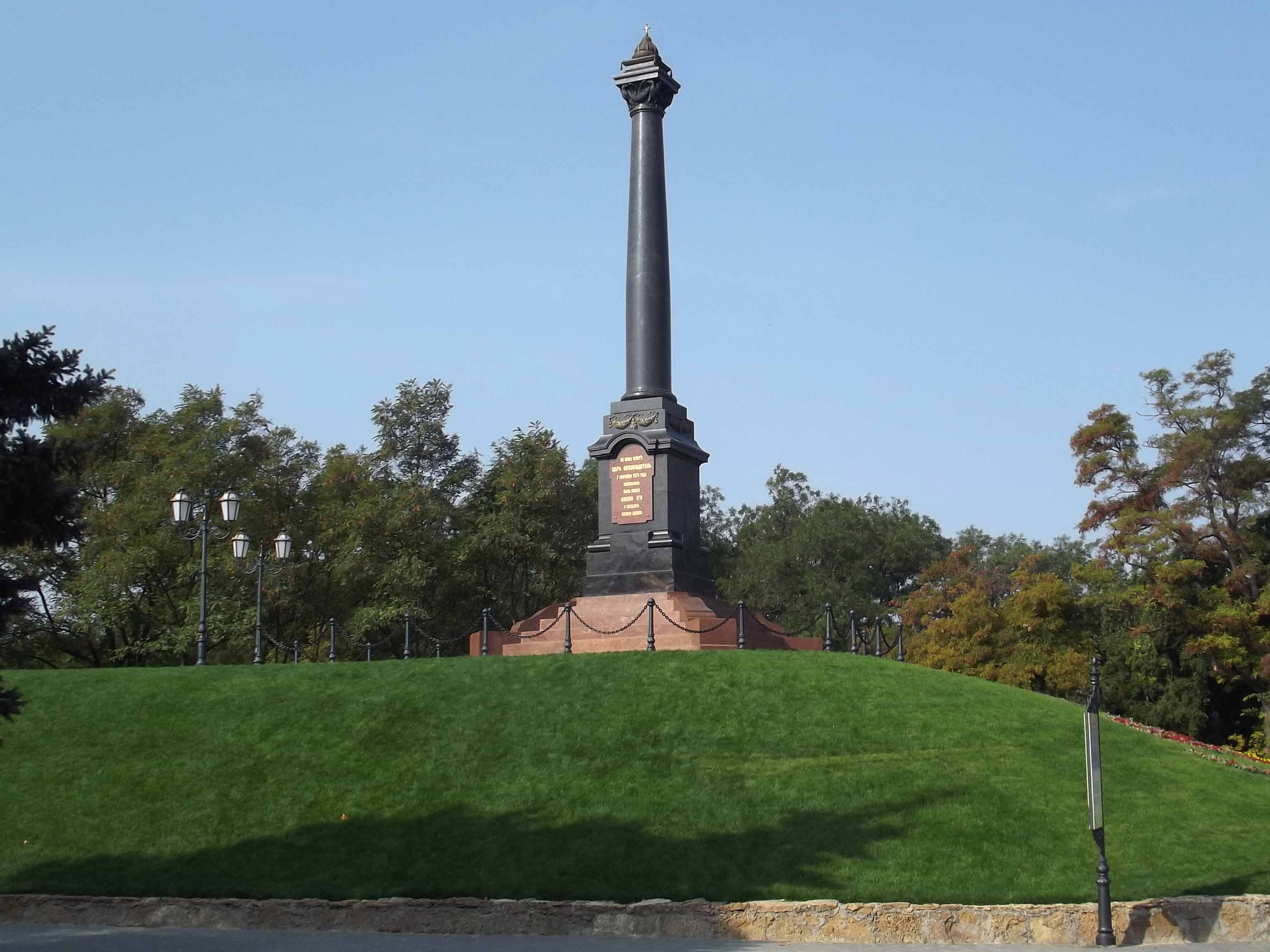
Major landmark, the Alexander's column

Taras Shevchenko Park of Culture and Recreation is in the centre of Odesa. It is located in the central part of the city. It carries the name of Taras Shevchenko since 1954.

== History ==
After the conquest of Khadzhibey in 1795, certain fortifications existed near Cape Langeron. Among these was the Odesa fortress, which constituted part of the so-called the Dniester Defensive Line, while located in the center of Odesa fortress was the Saint Andrew bastion. Following the Russo-Turkish War in 1811, the fortress was reorganized into a port side quarantine, and within the fortress a quarantine cemetery was established.

On city maps of the middle 19th century the area of quarantine was then known as "Serf's Garden." In 1840, according to the plans of Italian architect Francesco Boffo, this quarantine area was transformed into a garden. During this time the garden belonged to a military agency rather than city itself.

The park was officially opened on 7 September 1875 and on 10 September was named the "Alexander Park" after Alexander II of Russia himself had visited Odesa and planted an oak tree during the park's opening ceremony.

In 1936 the Stadium of Koscior, today known as the Chornomorets Stadium, was built.

== Major landmarks ==
- Monument to Alexander II of Russia
- Monument to Taras Shevchenko
- Chornomorets Stadium
- Alley of Glory (with Monument to the Unknown Sailor)
- Quarantine arches
- Ruins of the "Green Theatre"
- Special summer pavilion of tramway stop (park's administration)
- Langeron mansion gateway
