= Gulf of Odesa =

Part of the Black Sea in Ukraine

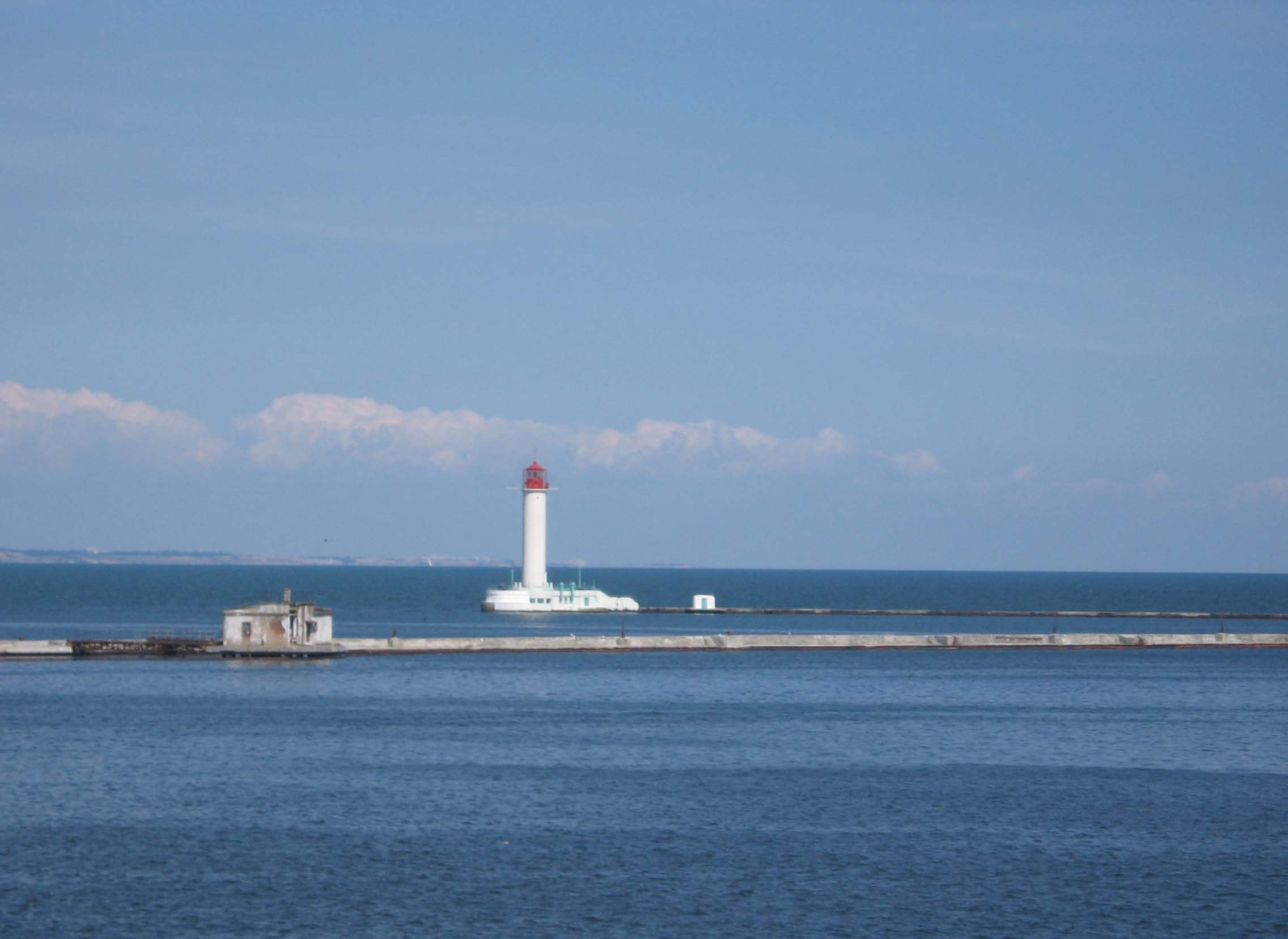
- Vorontsov Lighthouse, Odesa

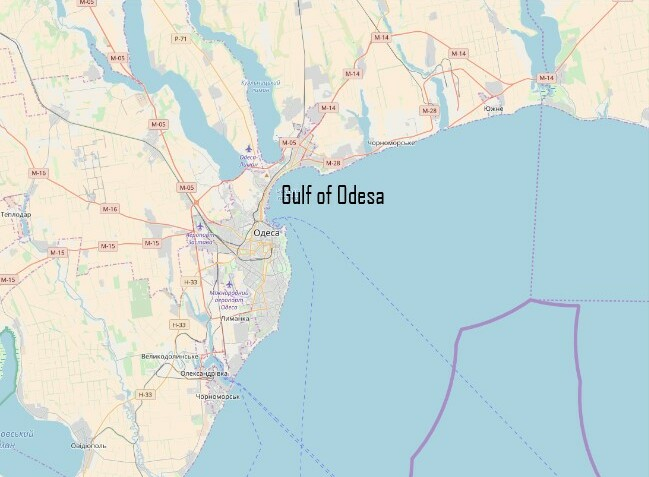

- Location within Ukraine
- Location: Black Sea
- Coordinates: 46°28′N 30°46′E
- Ocean/sea sources: Atlantic Ocean
- Basin countries: Ukraine
- Max. width: 20 kilometres (12 mi)
- Surface area: 38 square kilometres (15 sq mi)
- Salinity: 10-17 ‰
- Settlements: Odesa

The Gulf of Odesa, or Odesa Bay, (Ukrainian: Одеська затока, romanized: Odeska zatoka) is a part of the Black Sea between North Odesa Cape in the north and Cape Velykyi Fontan in the south.

== Overview ==
The coasts of the gulf have capes Langeron and Malyi Fontan. In the north-western part of the gulf the estuaries Kuyalnik and Khadzhibey are separated by the Kuyalnik-Khadzhibey sandbar. The gulf of Odesa is more like a bight, especially considering the fact that geologically it is an extension of Black Sea Lowland. The gulf is in the shape of an ellipse stretched from southwest to northeast. Its northeastern portion is more shallow having only up to 5 m (16 ft) of depth where its southwestern portion has 14 m (46 ft).

The Gulf of Odesa is under the influence of the flows of the rivers Dnieper, Dniester, and Danube. The salinity of the surface waters is normally 10–17‰, with upwelling up to 18‰, but decreases in some years to about 5–7‰.

The City of Odesa and the Port of Odesa are located on the coasts of the gulf.
