= Cape Velykyi Fontan =

Southern point of the Gulf of Odesa

Cape Velyky Fontan Мис Великий Фонтан
- Cape
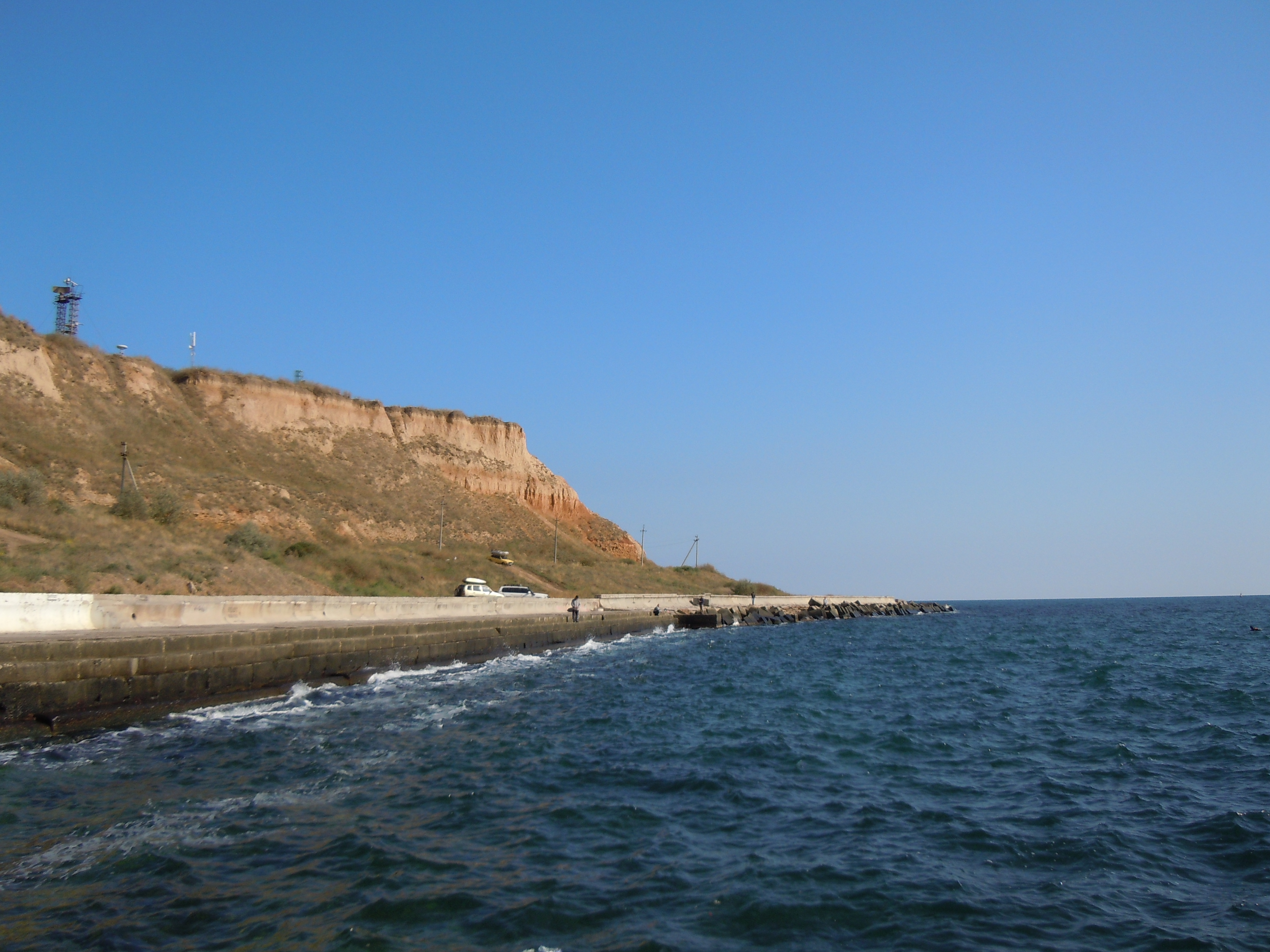
- Cape Velyky Fontan

- Coordinates: 46°22′31″N 30°45′07″E
- Location: Odesa, Ukraine

Cape Velykyi Fontan (some time translated as Big Fontan, or Great Fontan, Ukrainian: Мис Великий Фонтан) is a southern point of the Gulf of Odesa. It is located in the southern part of the city of Odesa.
