= Alexander II Column in Odesa =

Monument in Odesa, Ukraine

Coordinates: 46°28′42″N 30°45′17″E

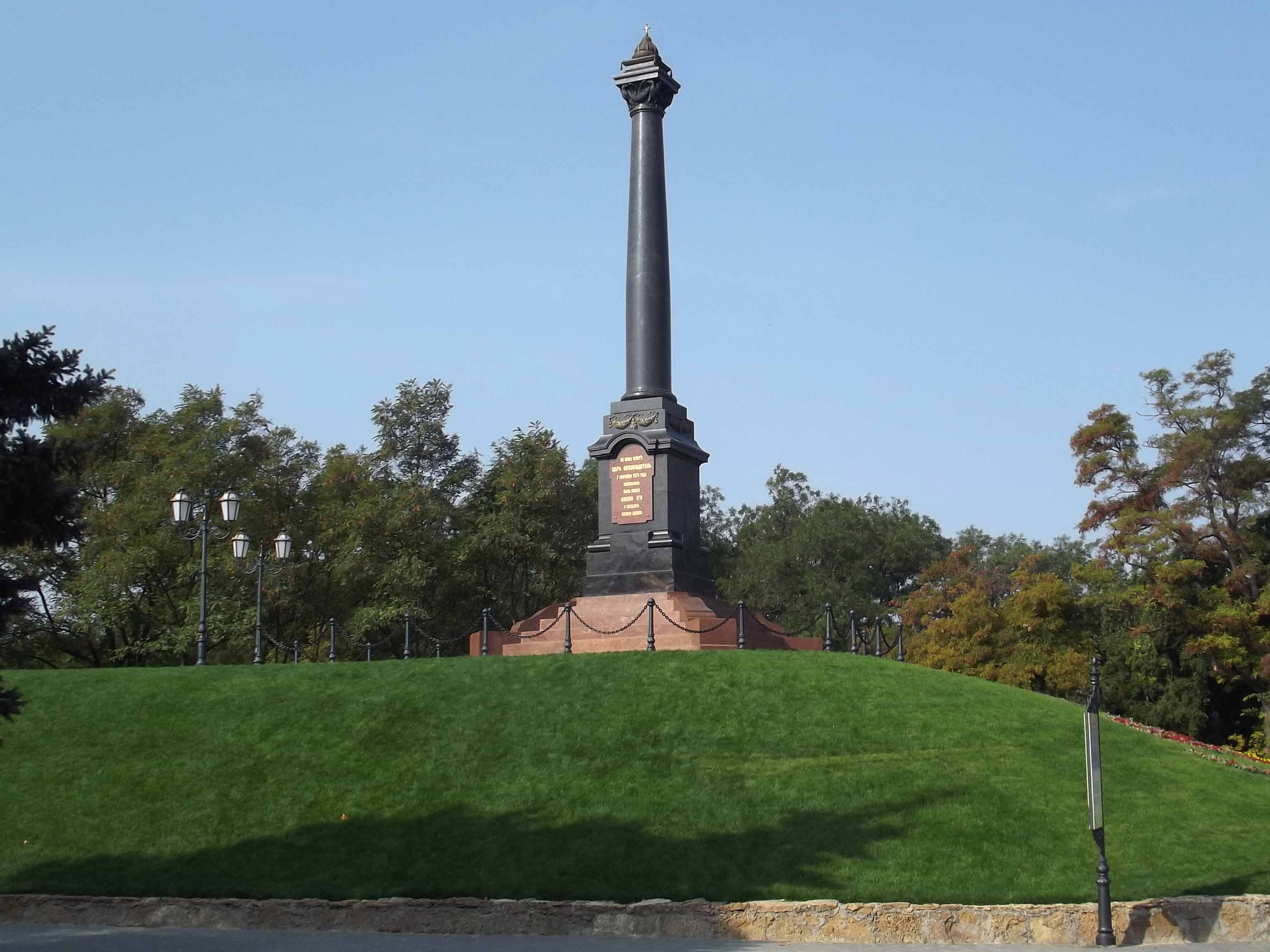
Alexander's column in 2011

Alexander II Column, also known as Alexander's column or Monument to Alexander II of Russia, is a triumphal column located in Shevchenko Park, Odesa and is commemorated to the visit of Russian Emperor Alexander II the city of Odesa in 1875.

The monument was built in May 1891 on the same place where the city's municipality was meeting the emperor Alexander II in 1875. For that purpose there was built the Tsar's pavilion where the monarch gave permission on establishing here a park named after him and planted the first tree. The monument was built on remnants of the Saint Andrew bastion (fortification motte) of Odesa Fortress that was built in 1793-1794 for border control and was declared inefficient for defence in 1811 as the borders of Russia moved further southwest.

== Gallery ==
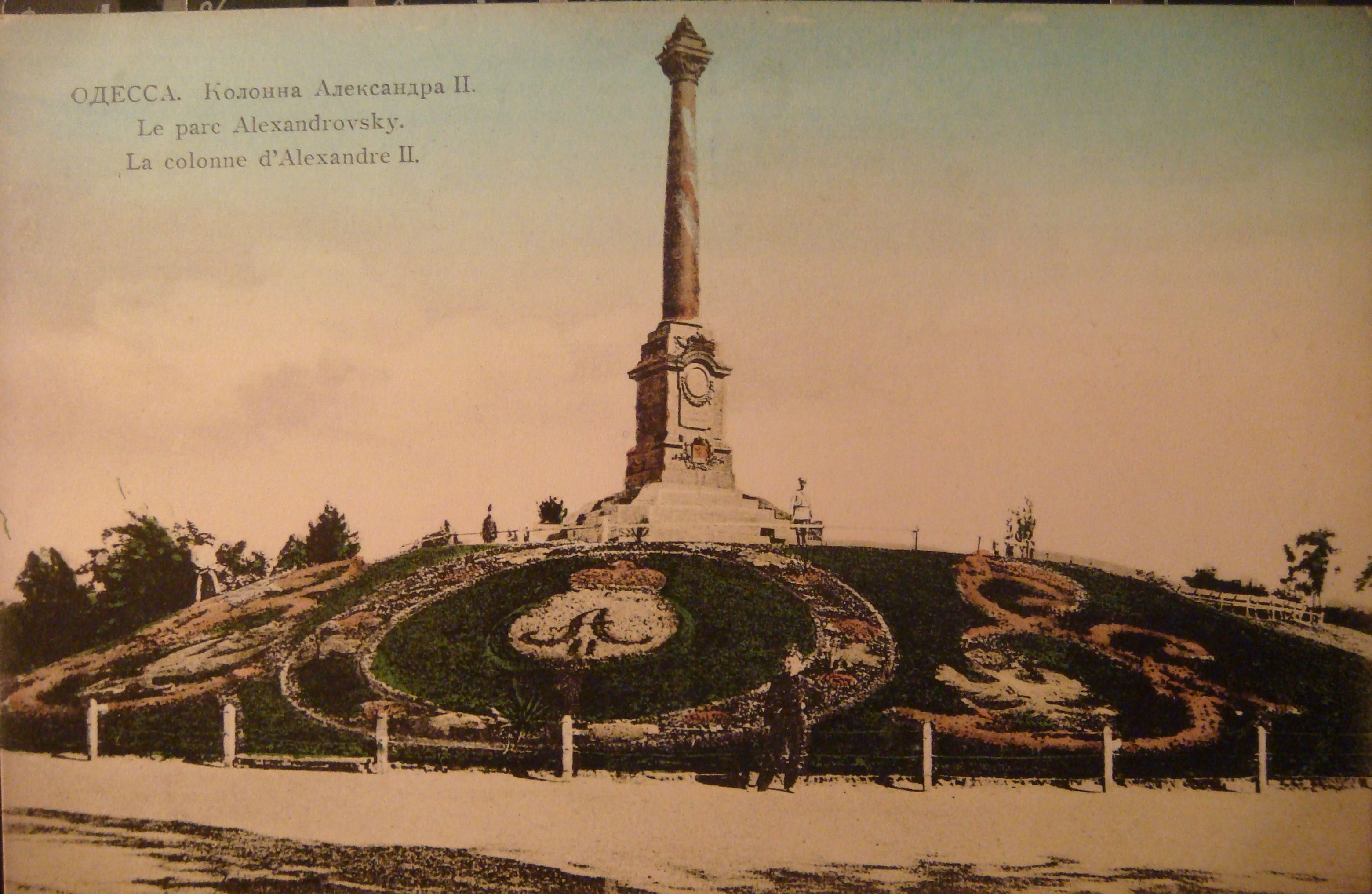
Old post card with the monument

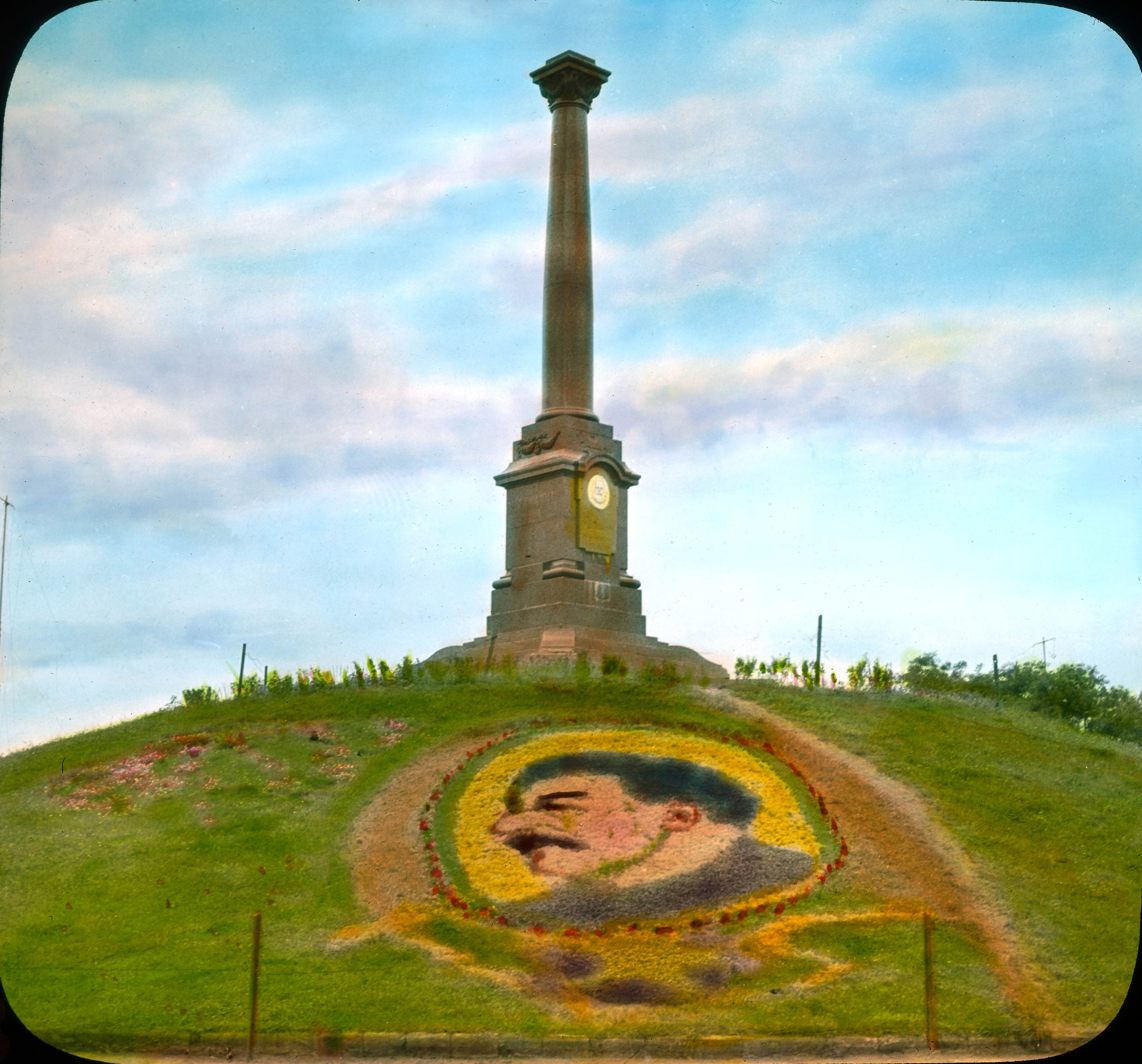
In 1931 it was known as the 2nd International monument with Stalin's depiction

== See also ==
- Shevchenko Park (Odesa)
