= Cape Malyi Fontan =

Cape in Odesa, Ukraine

Cape Malyi Fontan Мис Малий Фонтан
- Cape
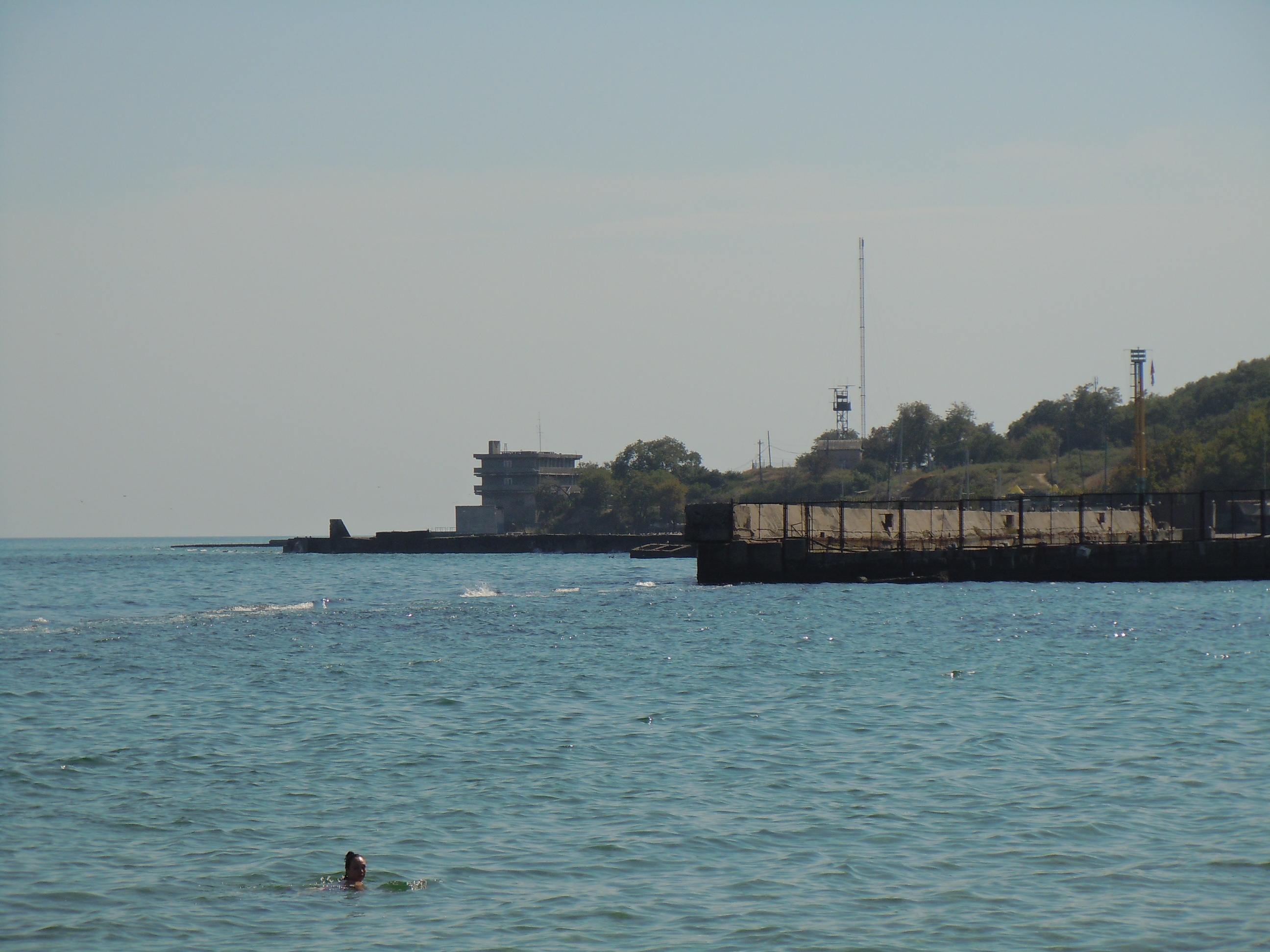
- View to the Cape Small Fontan from North

- Coordinates: 46°26′28″N 30°46′20″E
- Location: Odesa, Ukraine

Cape Malyi Fontan (sometime translated as Small Fontan, Ukrainian: Мис Малий Фонтан) is a cape in the central part of the Gulf of Odesa. It is located in the centre of the City of Odesa, in the site of Arkadia. The Hydrobiological Station of the Odesa University is located on the cape.
