= Malyi (surname) =

Malyi (Ukrainian: Малий, meaning "little", "small") is a surname. Notable people with the surname include:

- Eduard Malyi (born 1969), Russian footballer
- Leon Malyi (born 1958), Ukrainian bishop
- Serhiy Malyi (born 1990), Ukrainian-Kazakhstani footballer
