= Cape Langeron =

Cape in Odesa, Ukraine

Cape Langeron Мис Ланжерон
- Cape
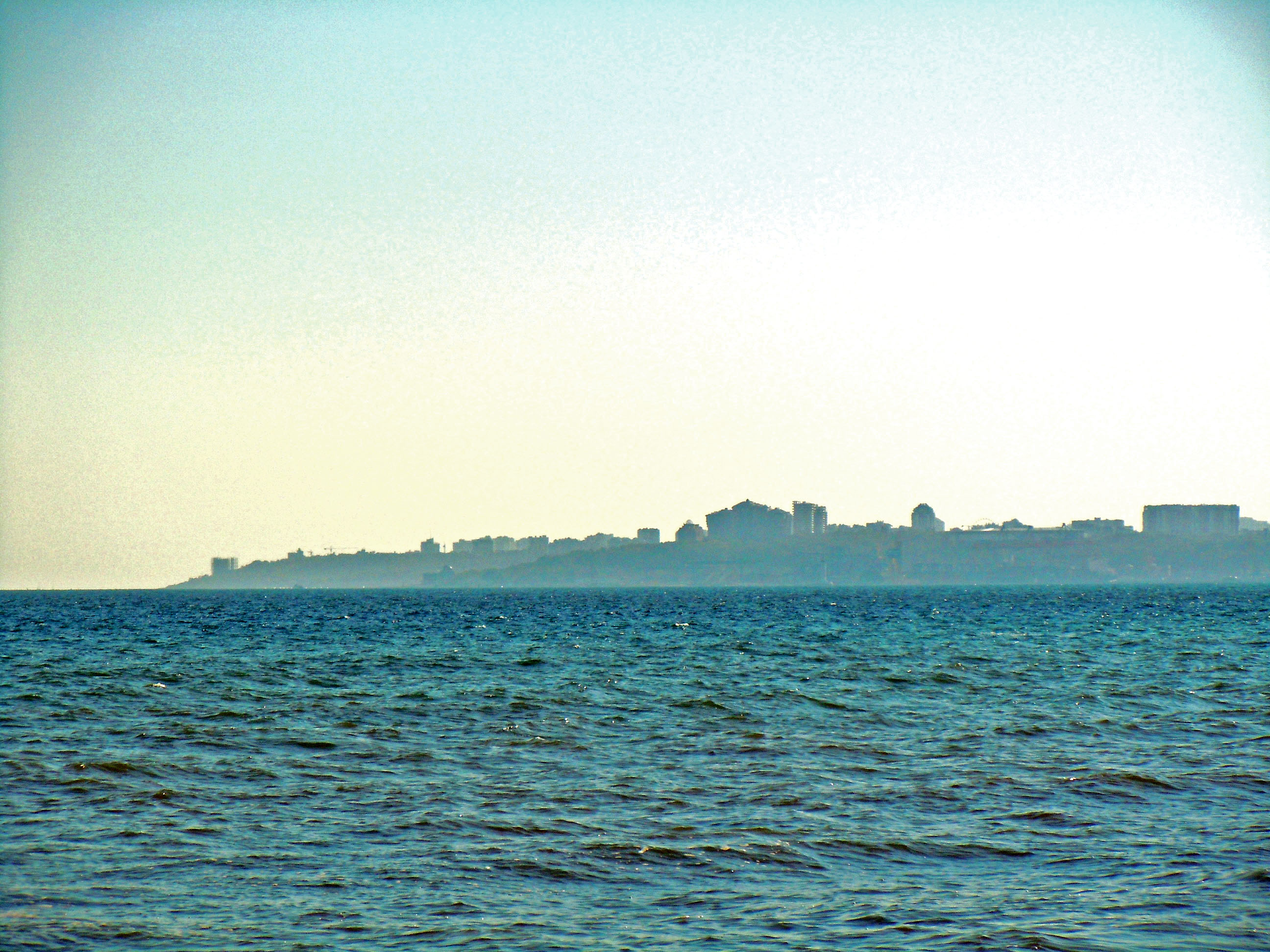
- View to the Gulf of Odesa from the Cape Langeron

- Coordinates: 46°28′37″N 30°45′57″E
- Location: Odesa, Ukraine
- Offshore water bodies: Gulf of Odesa

Cape Langeron (Ukrainian: Мис Ланжерон, romanized: Mys Lanzheron) is a cape in the central part of the Gulf of Odesa, Ukraine. It is located near the City of Odesa. The cape is named after Count Louis Alexandre Andrault de Langeron, the summer residence was located on this cape.
