= Khadzhibey Estuary =

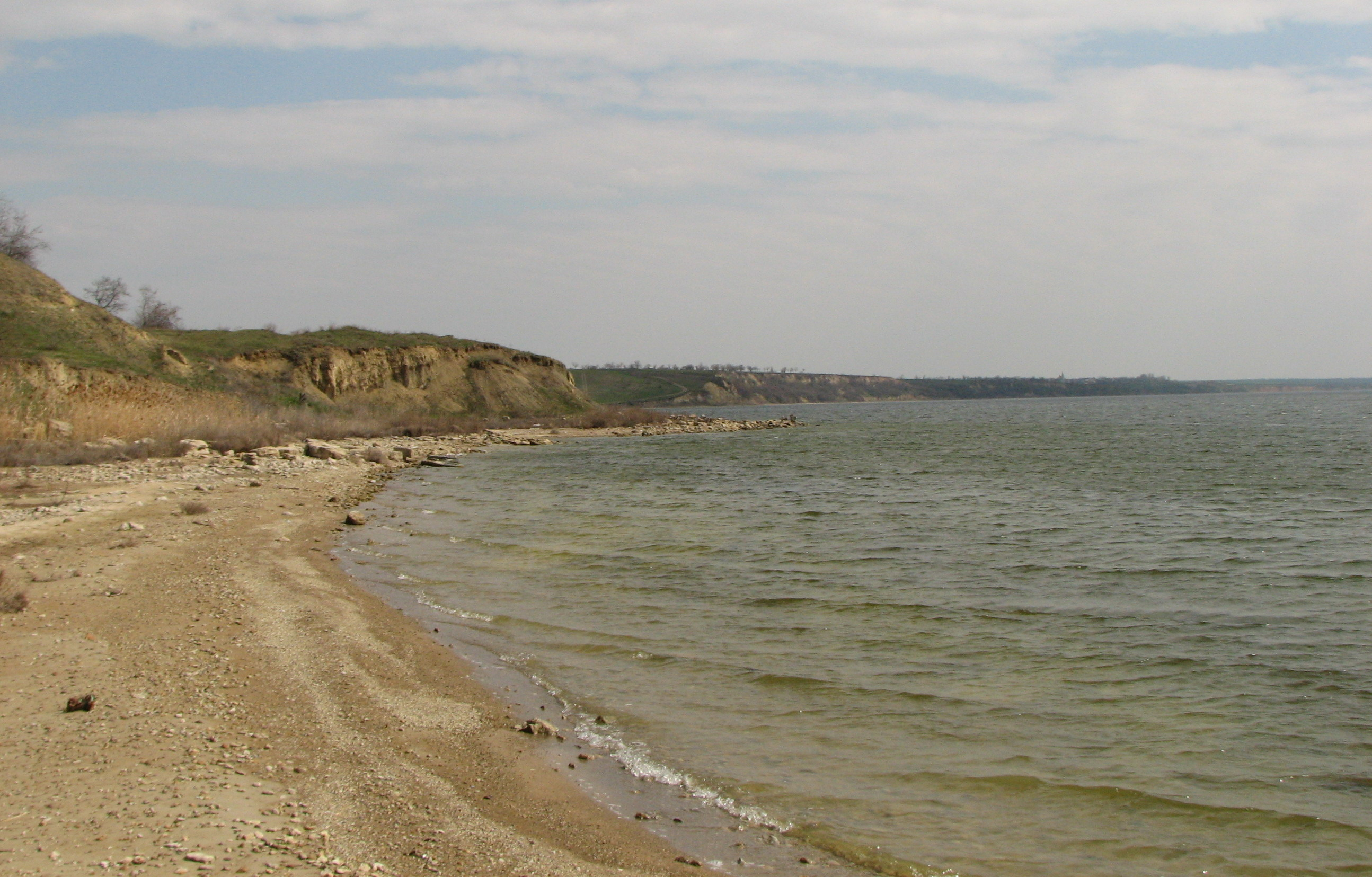
- The coast of the Khadzhibey Estuary

- Location within Odesa Oblast
- Location: Ukraine
- Coordinates: 46°37′N 30°36′E
- Type: estuary
- Primary inflows: Malyi Kuialnyk
- Basin countries: Ukraine
- Max. length: 33 km (21 mi)
- Max. width: 3.5 km (2.2 mi)
- Surface area: 112 km^{2} (43 sq mi)
- Average depth: 5 m (16 ft)
- Max. depth: 18.3 m (60 ft)
- Water volume: 560×10^{6} m^{3} (20×10^{9} cu ft)
- Salinity: 3-6 percent
- Settlements: Odesa

The Khadzhibey Estuary, or Khadzhybeiskyi Lyman (Ukrainian: Хаджибейський лиман; Turkish: Hacıbey limanı), is an estuary of the north-western part of the Black Sea, located on the north-west from the City of Odesa. It is named after the former Khadzhibey fortress.

The estuary is separated from the sea by the Kuyalnytsky-Khadzhibey peresyp – sandbar, which is about 5 km in length. The length of the estuary is 31 km, width 0.5–2.5 km, square 70 km^{2}, depth up to 2.5 m. The bottom of the estuary is covered with black mud, which are reputed to have therapeutic properties.

The river Malyi Kuialnyk flows to the estuary. The fauna of the estuary consists of crabs Rhithropanopeus harrisii, shrimps Palaemon elegans, round goby Neogobius melanostomus and monkey goby Neogobius fluviatilis, etc.

== See also ==
- Berezan Estuary
- Dniester Estuary
- Small Adzhalyk Estuary
- Tylihul Estuary
- Sukhyi Estuary
