= Tylihul =

Tylihul may refer to:

- Tylihul Estuary, a water body in southern Ukraine
- Tylihul (river), a river in southern Ukraine
- CS Tiligul-Tiras Tiraspol, defunct football club in the Republic of Moldova
