= Novi Biliari =

Rural locality in Odesa Oblast, Ukraine

Novi Biliari Нові Білярі
- Rural settlement
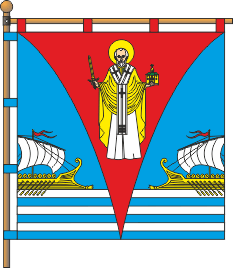
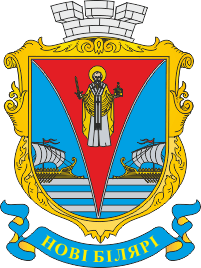
- Flag Coat of arms

- Location within Odesa Oblast Location within Ukraine
- Coordinates: 46°38′09″N 31°00′05″E
- Country: Ukraine
- Oblast: Odesa Oblast
- Raion: Odesa Raion
- Hromada: Yuzhne urban hromada

Population (2022)
  - Total: 182
- Time zone: UTC+2 (EET)
  - Summer (DST): UTC+3 (EEST)

Novi Biliari (Ukrainian: Нові Білярі; Russian: Новые Беляры) is a rural settlement in Odesa Raion of Odesa Oblast in Ukraine. It belongs to Yuzhne urban hromada, one of the hromadas of Ukraine. Population: 182 (2022 estimate)

Novi Biliari is located on the right bank of the Small Adzhalyk Estuary, east of the city of Odesa.

== History ==
On the site of the present settlement Novi Biliari there was a German colony called Anental.

Until 18 July 2020, Novi Biliari belonged to Lyman Raion. The raion was abolished in July 2020 as part of the administrative reform of Ukraine, which reduced the number of raions of Odesa Oblast to seven. The area of Lyman Raion was split between Berezivka and Odesa Raions, with Novi Biliari transferred to Odesa Raion.

Until 26 January 2024, Novi Biliari was designated urban-type settlement. On this day, a new law entered into force which abolished this status, and Novi Biliari became a rural settlement.

== Economy ==
=== Transportation ===
Novi Biliari is on the Highway M28 connecting Odesa with Pivdenne where it connects to the Highway M14 which runs to Mykolaiv.

There is a railway line which runs from Chornomorska to Novi Biliari, but there is no passenger traffic. The closest railway stations with passenger traffic are in Odesa.
