= Koshary, Odesa Raion, Odesa Oblast =

Rural locality in Odesa Oblast, Ukraine

Koshary Кошари
- Village
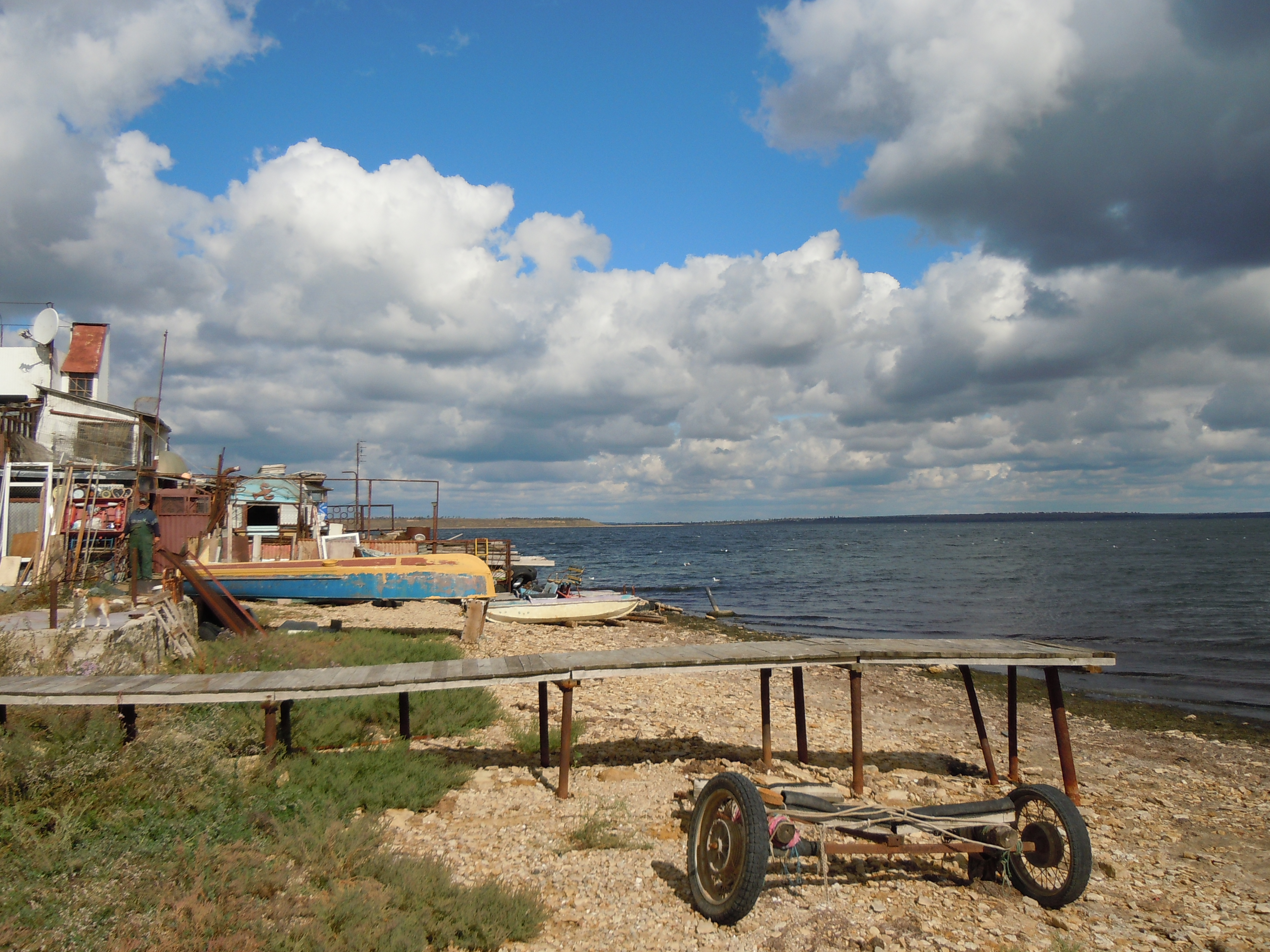
- Interactive map of Koshary
- Location of Koshary Koshary (Ukraine)
- Coordinates: 46°39′58″N 31°09′18″E
- Country: Ukraine
- Oblast: Odesa Oblast
- Raion: Odesa Raion
- Hromada: Yuzhne urban hromada
- Founded: 1887

Area
  - Total: 0.49 km^{2} (0.19 sq mi)
- Elevation: 21 m (69 ft)

Population (2001)
  - Total: 161
  - Density: 330/km^{2} (850/sq mi)
- Time zone: UTC+2 (EET)
  - Summer (DST): UTC+3 (EEST)
- Postal code: 67555
- Area code: +380 4855
- Climate: Dfa

Koshary (Ukrainian: Кошари) is a village in Odesa Raion, Odesa Oblast (province) of south-western Ukraine. It forms part of Yuzhne urban hromada, one of the hromadas of Ukraine. It is situated on the country's Black Sea coast and the Tylihul Estuary.

The ancient city of Odessos is thought to be located near Koshary.

== History ==
Koshary was founded in 1887.

Until 18 July 2020, Koshary was located in Lyman Raion. The raion was abolished in July 2020 as part of the administrative reform of Ukraine, which reduced the number of raions of Odesa Oblast to seven. The area of Lyman Raion was split between Berezivka and Odesa Raions and Koshary was transferred to the latter.

== Demographics ==
According to the 1989 census, the population of the village was 212 people, of whom 98 were men and 114 were women. According to the 2001 census of Ukraine, 161 people lived in the village.

=== Languages ===
Native language as of the Ukrainian Census of 2001:

Language	Percentage
Ukrainian	94.41 %
Russian	5.59 %
