= Odesa Portside Plant =

Chemical-industrial enterprise in Odesa Oblast, Ukraine

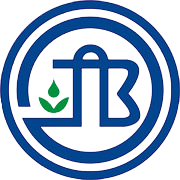

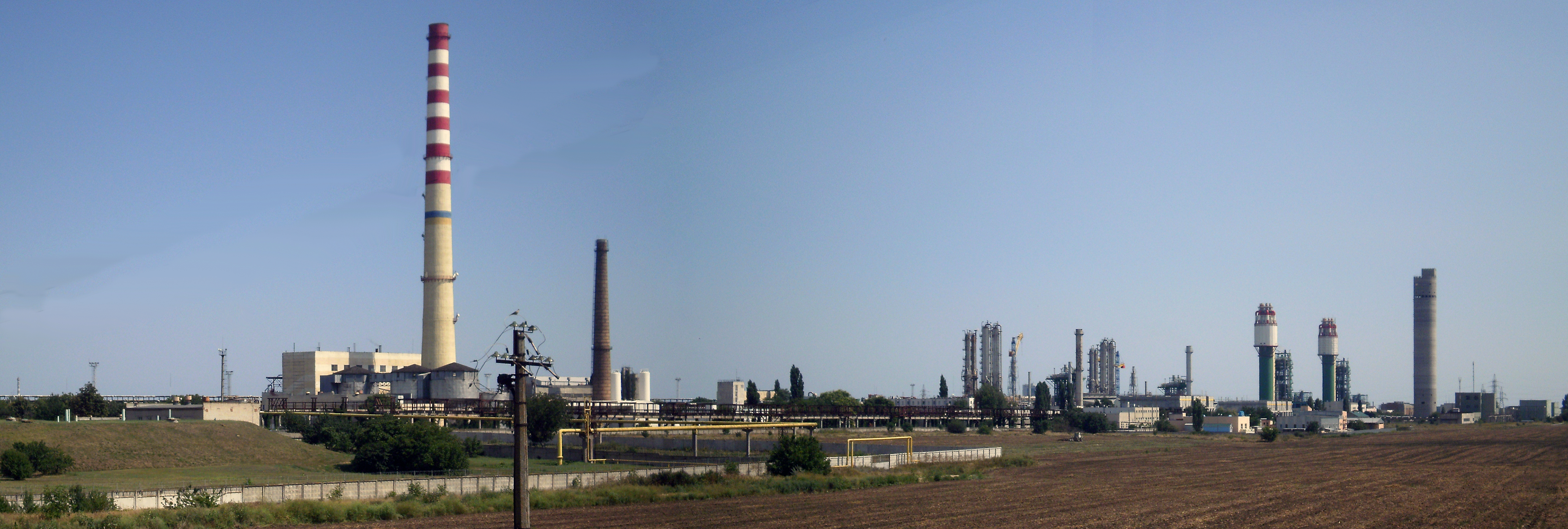
- Native name: Одеський припортовий завод
- Company type: Joint Stock Company
- Industry: Chemical
- Founded: 1974
- Headquarters: Zavodska Street, 3, Pivdenne, 65481, Odesa Oblast, Ukraine
- Number of employees: 3786

Odesa Portside Plant is a chemical-industrial enterprise in Odesa Oblast, Ukraine. The chemical plant is located on the shores of the Small Adzhalyk Estuary and is situated next to Pivdennyi Port through which chemical cargo is transshipped. The key stake belongs to Group DF.

In May 2022, the plant was shelled by Russians missiles.

== Gallery ==
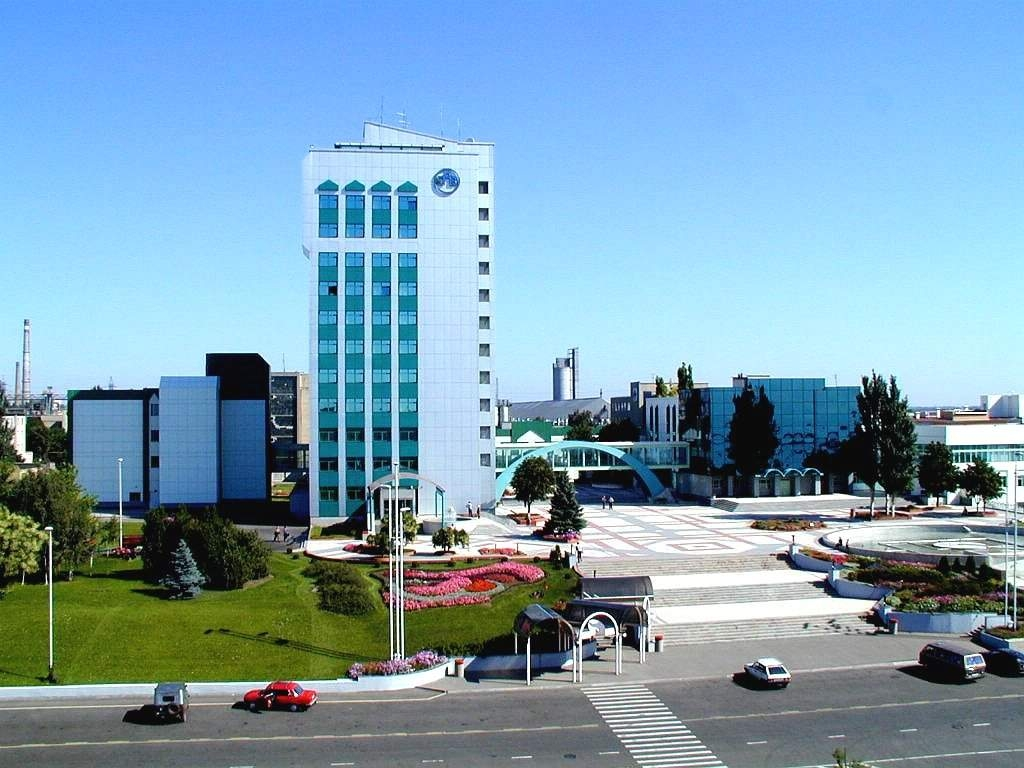
JSC "Odesa Port Plant" - panorama.

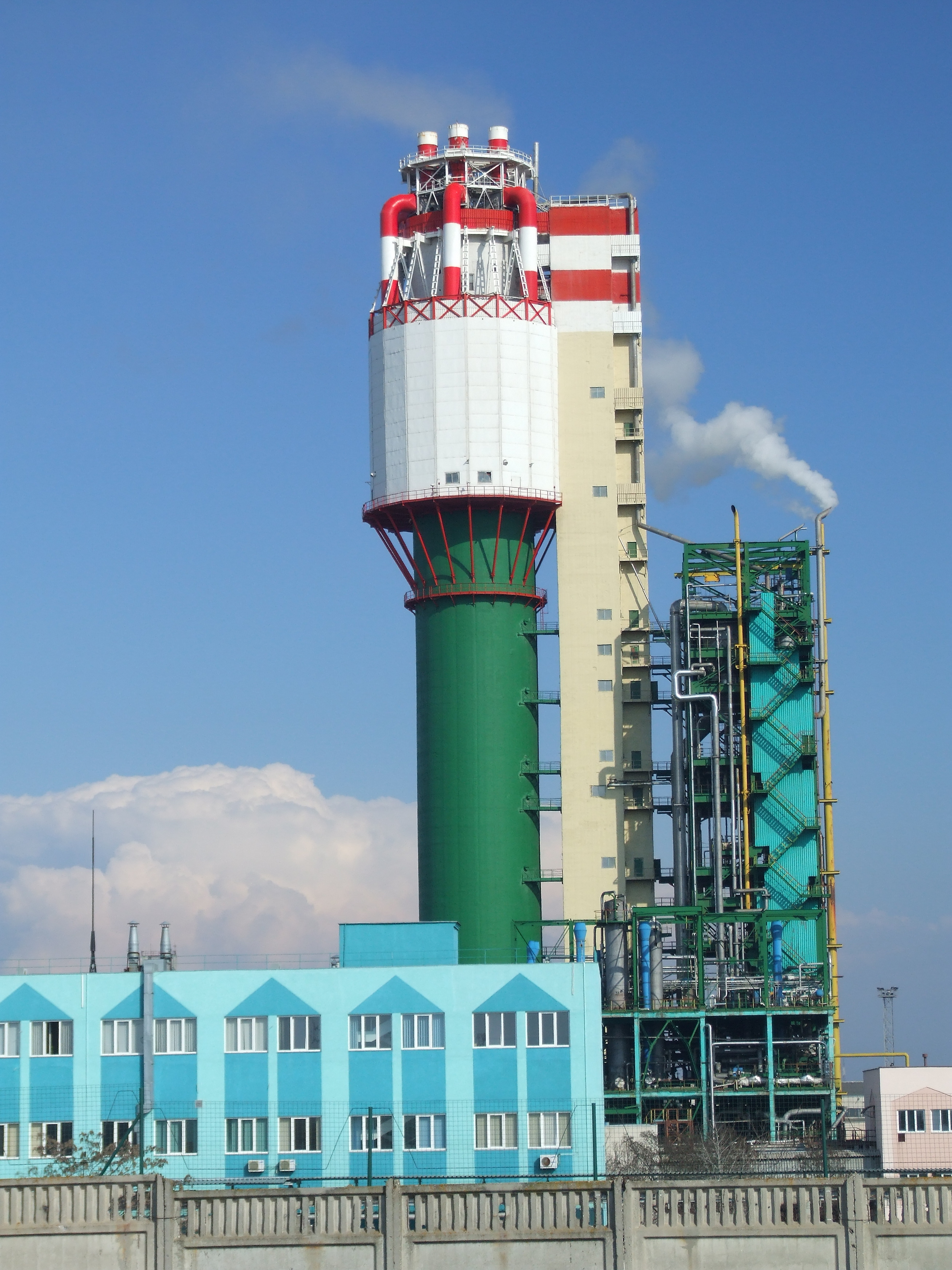
OPP tower.

== See also ==
- DniproAzot
