= Pivdenne urban hromada =

Coordinates: 46°37′N 31°06′E

Pivdenne urban hromada Південнівська міська громада
- Hromada
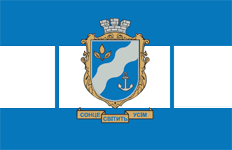
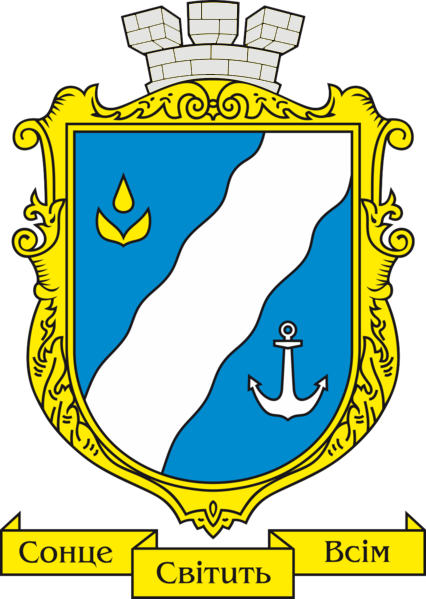
- Flag Coat of arms
- Interactive map of Pivdenne urban hromada
- Country: Ukraine
- Oblast: Odesa Oblast
- Raion: Odesa Raion
- Admin. center: Pivdenne

Area
  - Total: 115.4 km^{2} (44.6 sq mi)

Population (2020)
  - Total: 35,273
  - Density: 305.7/km^{2} (791.7/sq mi)
- CATOTTG code: UA51100410000059549
- Settlements: 7
- Cities: 1
- Rural settlements: 1
- Villages: 5
- Website: https://ymtg.gov.ua/

Pivdenne urban hromada (Ukrainian: Південнівська міська громада) is a hromada in Odesa Raion of Odesa Oblast in southwestern Ukraine. Population: 35,273 (2020 est.)

The hromada consists of the city of Pivdenne, a rural settlement Novi Biliari and 5 villages:

- Biliari
- Buldynka
- Hryhorivka
- Koshary
- Sychavka

== Links ==
- Yuzhne urban hromada // Облікова картка на офіційному вебсайті Верховної Ради України.
- картка Постанови ВР
- https://decentralization.gov.ua/newgromada/4397#
