= Pivdenne, Odesa Oblast =

City in Odesa Oblast, Ukraine

Pivdenne Південне
- City
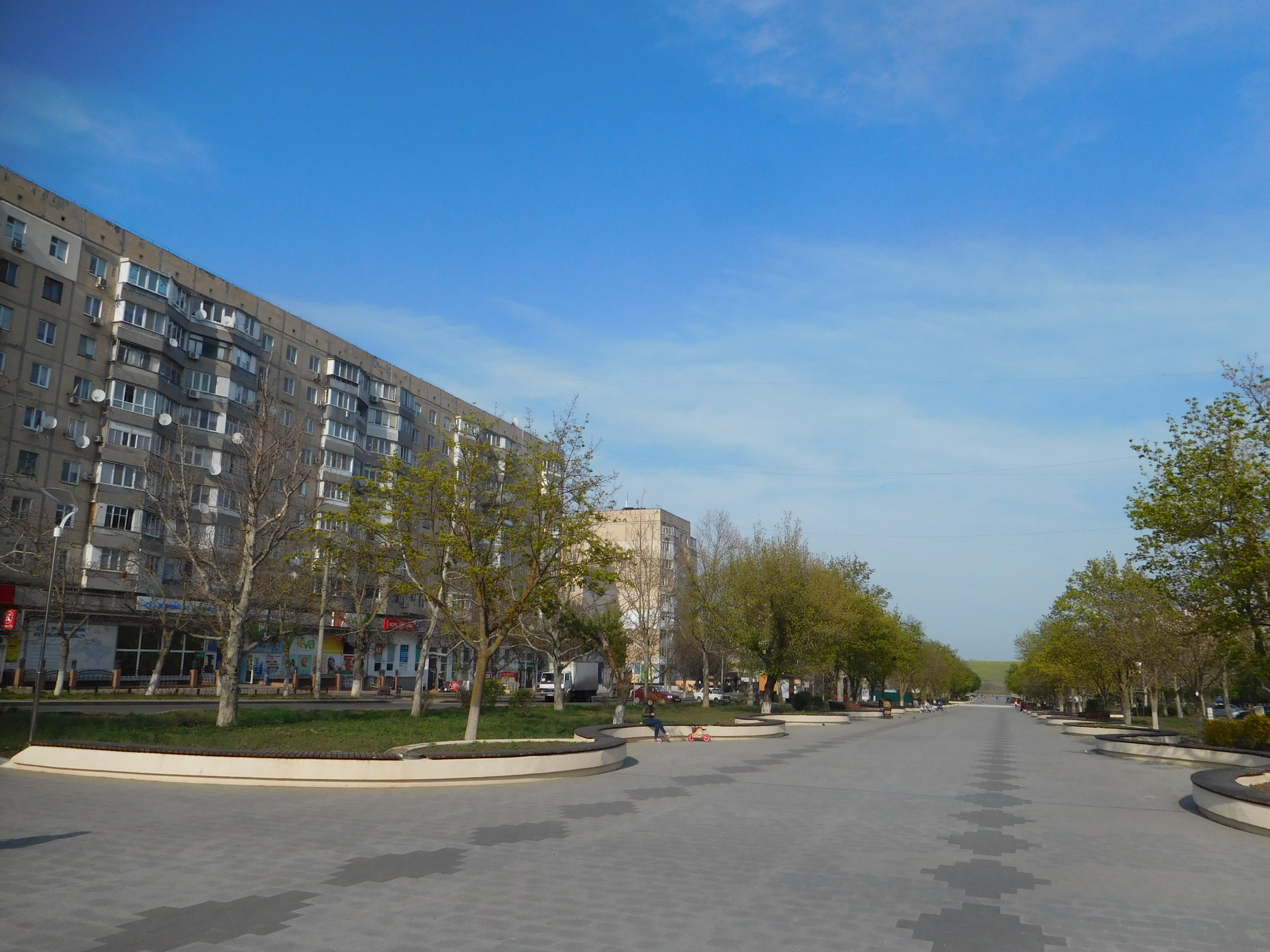
- Myru Avenue - the central street of the city

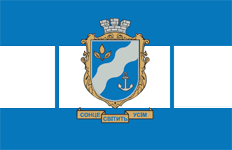
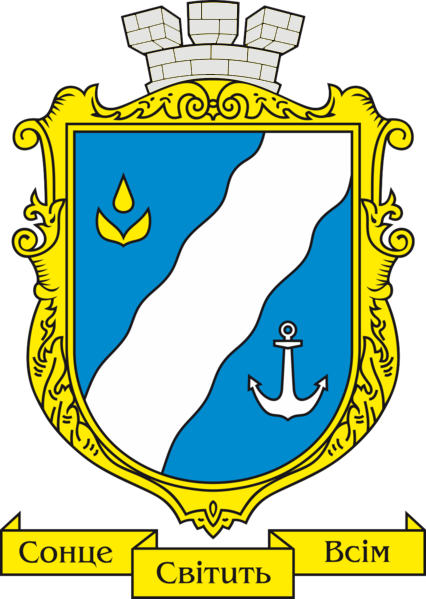
- Flag Coat of arms

- Location in Ukraine Pivdenne (Ukraine)
- Coordinates: 46°37′25″N 31°06′04″E
- Country: Ukraine
- Oblast: Odesa Oblast
- Raion: Odesa Raion
- Hromada: Pivdenne urban hromada
- Elevation: 34 m (112 ft)

Population (2022)
  - Total: 32,677
- Time zone: UTC+2 (EET)
  - Summer (DST): UTC+3 (EEST)
- Postal code: 65481—65489
- Area code: +380-4842
- Climate: Cfa
- Website: yuzhne.city

Pivdenne (Ukrainian: Південне, IPA: [piu̯ˈdɛnːe]), formerly known as Yuzhne (Южне, IPA: [ˈjuʒne]; from Russian for 'Southern'), is a port city in Odesa Raion, Odesa Oblast of south-western Ukraine. Pivdenne hosts the administration of Pivdenne urban hromada, one of the hromadas of Ukraine. It is situated on the country's Black Sea coast. Population: 32,677 (2022 estimate).

Initially created as a settlement of the Odesa Portside Plant in the Small Adzhalyk Estuary, since 1981 it was transformed into a suburb of Odesa within the Suvorovsky District of the city. From the Southern Marine Terminal of the city port, the Odesa–Brody pipeline takes its beginning towards the Western Ukraine.

Until 18 July 2020, Yuzhne was incorporated as a city of oblast significance. In July 2020, as part of the administrative reform of Ukraine, which reduced the number of raions of Odesa Oblast to seven, the city of Yuzhne was merged into newly established Odesa Raion.

The city's port Pivdennyi is an internationally important oil terminal, and one of Ukraine's top three ports, with Odesa and Chornomorsk. These three nearby port cities have grown into a single conurbation, and Pivdenne is considered a satellite of Odesa.

== Name ==
11 May 1978 by the order of the Presidium of the Verkhovna Rada (parliament) of the Ukrainian SSR the newly built populated place was given the name of the village Yuzhne. Although it sounds awkward in Ukrainian, the city's name is the Russian word for "Southern". The Ukrainian term for "Southern" would be Pivdenne. The city is located about 32 km (20 mi) east of Odesa.

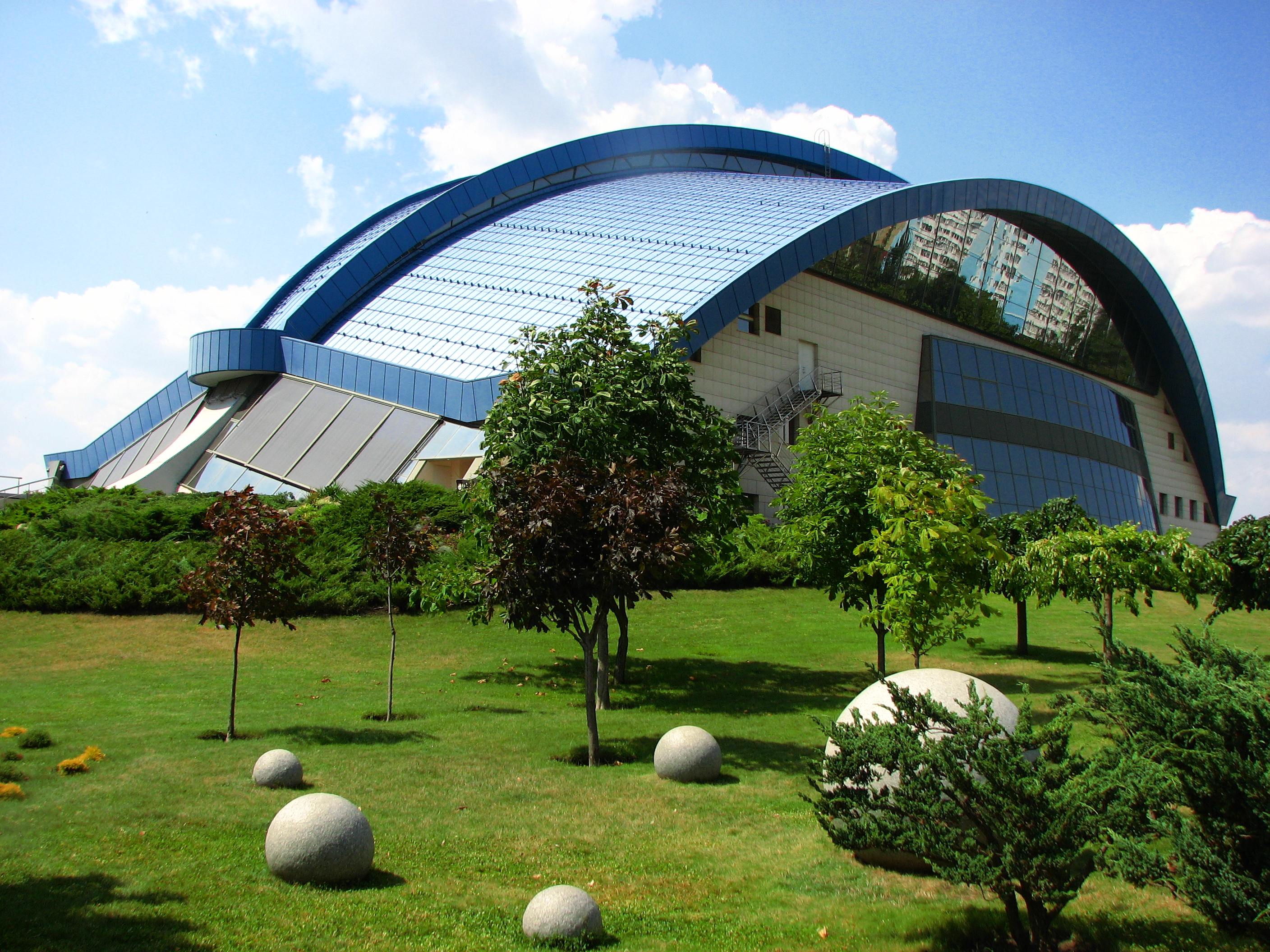
Olimp Sports Complex in Pivdenne

In February 1993 the Verkhovna Rada declared to give the urbanized village a special status in the Odesa Oblast as a city of oblast significance. In 2000 the declaration of Verkhovna Rada #1914-III confirmed the city limits.

In April 2023 the city council of Yuzhne decided to rename the city since the city name was not in accordance with the requirements of the law "On Ensuring the Functioning of the Ukrainian Language as the State Language". It was stated that the name of the city did not meet the spelling norms and standards of Ukrainian (the state language). On 20 March 2024, the Committee of the Verkhovna Rada on issues of organization of state power, local self-government, regional development and urban planning decided to propose the name Port-Anental.

On 9 October 2024, the Verkhovna Rada voted to rename Yuzhne to Pivdenne. Meanwhile, the proposed name Port-Annental did not get enough votes and was rejected.

== Geography ==
=== Climate ===
Pivdenne has a humid subtropical climate (Köppen: Cfa).

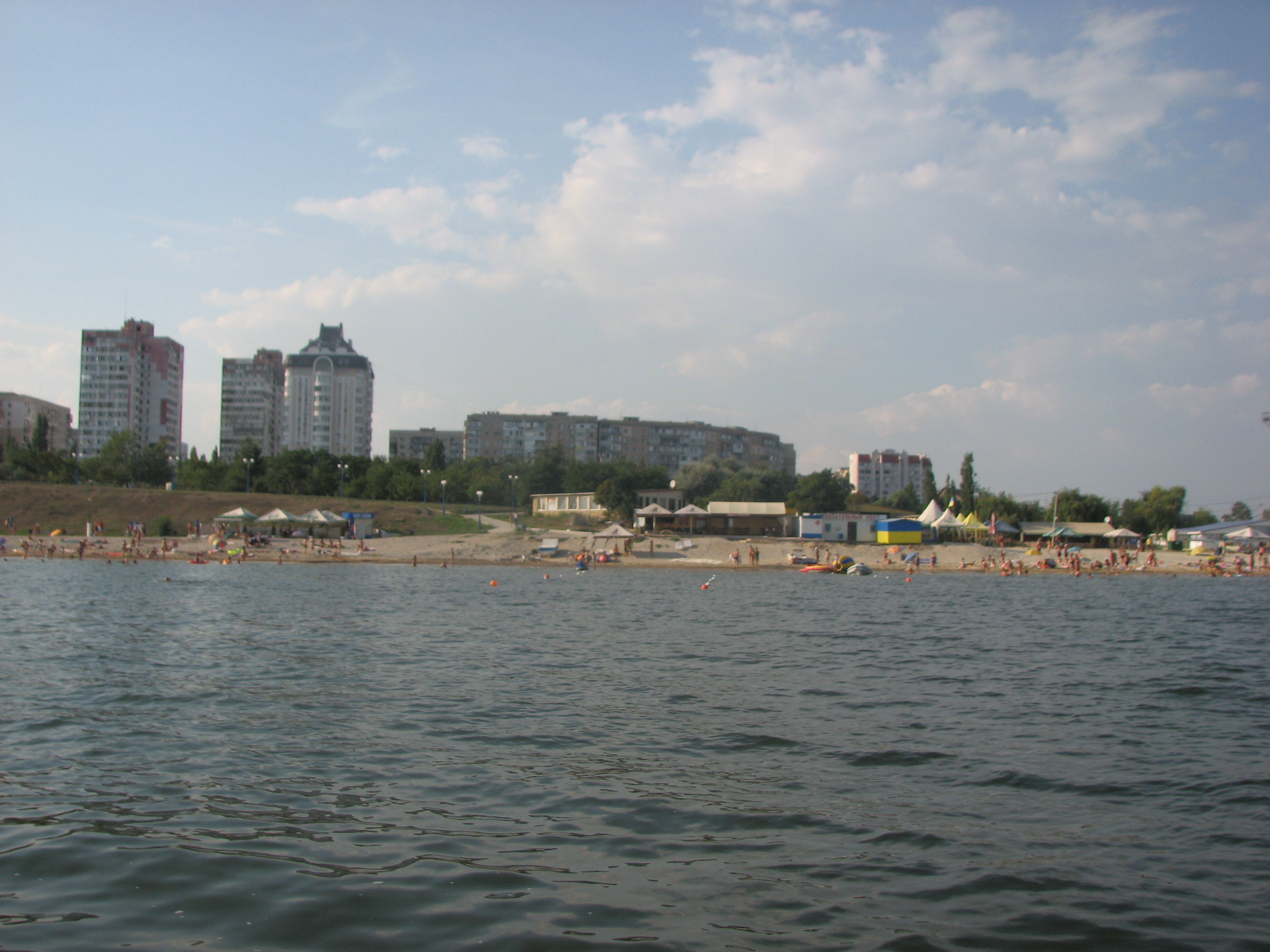
Pivdenne beach

Climate data for Pivdenne
Month	Jan	Feb	Mar	Apr	May	Jun	Jul	Aug	Sep	Oct	Nov	Dec	Year
Daily mean °C (°F)	−1.9 (28.6)	−1.1 (30.0)	2.5 (36.5)	9.4 (48.9)	15.5 (59.9)	20.0 (68.0)	22.3 (72.1)	21.7 (71.1)	16.9 (62.4)	11.1 (52.0)	5.3 (41.5)	1.1 (34.0)	10.2 (50.4)
Average precipitation mm (inches)	36 (1.4)	37 (1.5)	29 (1.1)	32 (1.3)	39 (1.5)	47 (1.9)	50 (2.0)	36 (1.4)	38 (1.5)	26 (1.0)	39 (1.5)	43 (1.7)	452 (17.8)
Average precipitation days	6	7	9	6	7	8	4	2	4	6	7	11	77
Mean monthly sunshine hours	158	220	305	353	413	418	440	409	345	296	204	163	3,724
Average ultraviolet index	2	4	5	8	9	11	11	10	7	5	2	2	6
Source 1: Climate-Data.org
Source 2: Monthly climate in Pivdenne, Ukraine

== Demographics ==
According to the 2001 Ukrainian census, Pivdenne (formerly Yuzhne) had a population of 24,167 inhabitants. The distribution of the population by ethnicity was as follows:

Ethnic composition of Pivdenne
	percent
Ukrainians	65.93%
Russians	29.01%
Bulgarians	1.28%
Belarusians	1.06%
Moldovans	0.77%
Armenians	0.30%
Gagauz	0.17%
Poles	0.13%
Jews	0.08%
Georgians	0.05%

== Sport ==
Pivdenne is home to the team BC Khimik in the Ukrainian Basketball Superleague, league champions in the 2014/15 season. Pivdenne is also home to the "BK Khimik" women's volleyball team, Ukrainian champions in 2010/11 and 2011/12. The handball team named HC Portovik plays in the highest men's League.

== Gallery ==
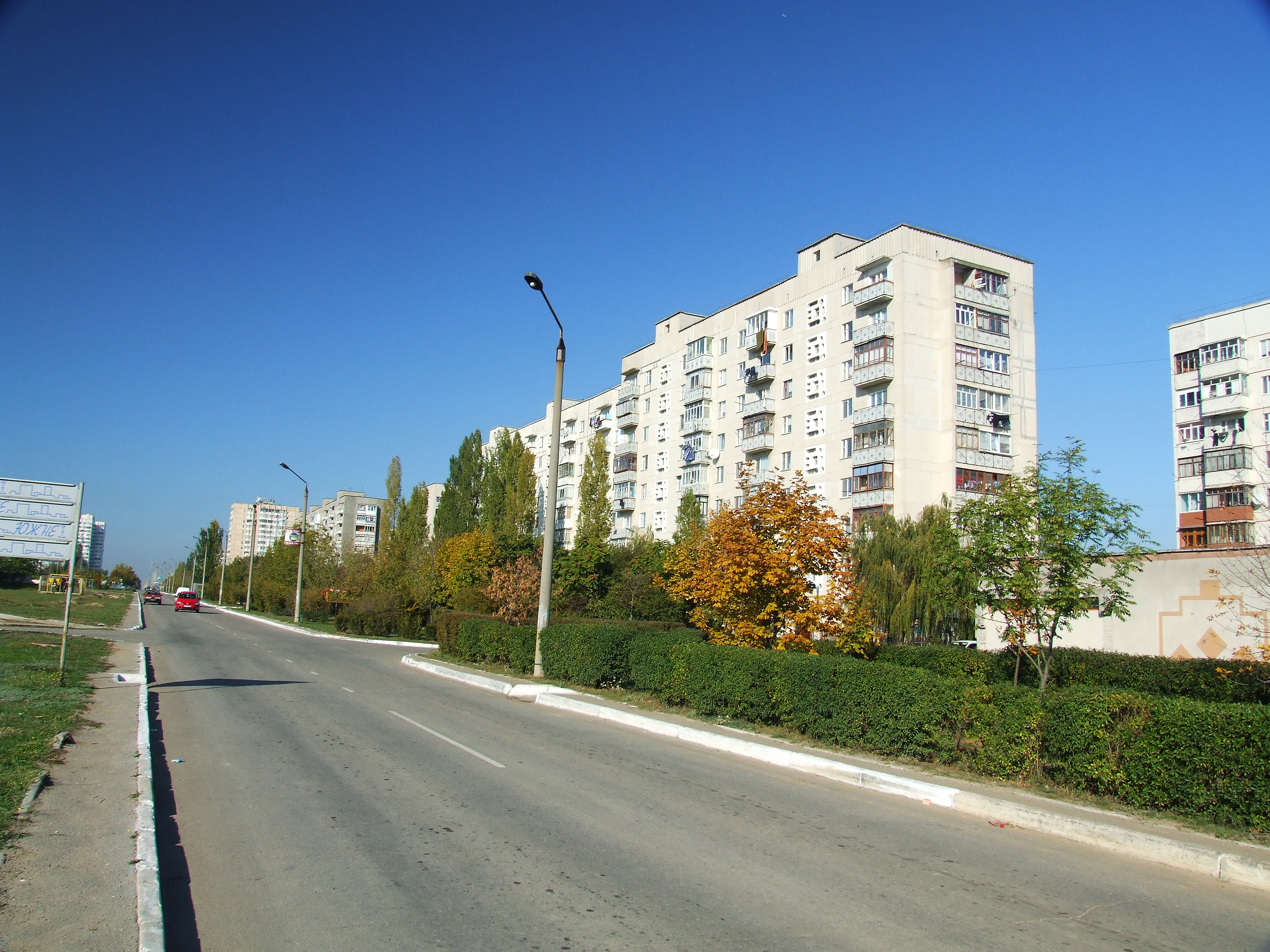
Hryhorivskoho Desantu Avenue

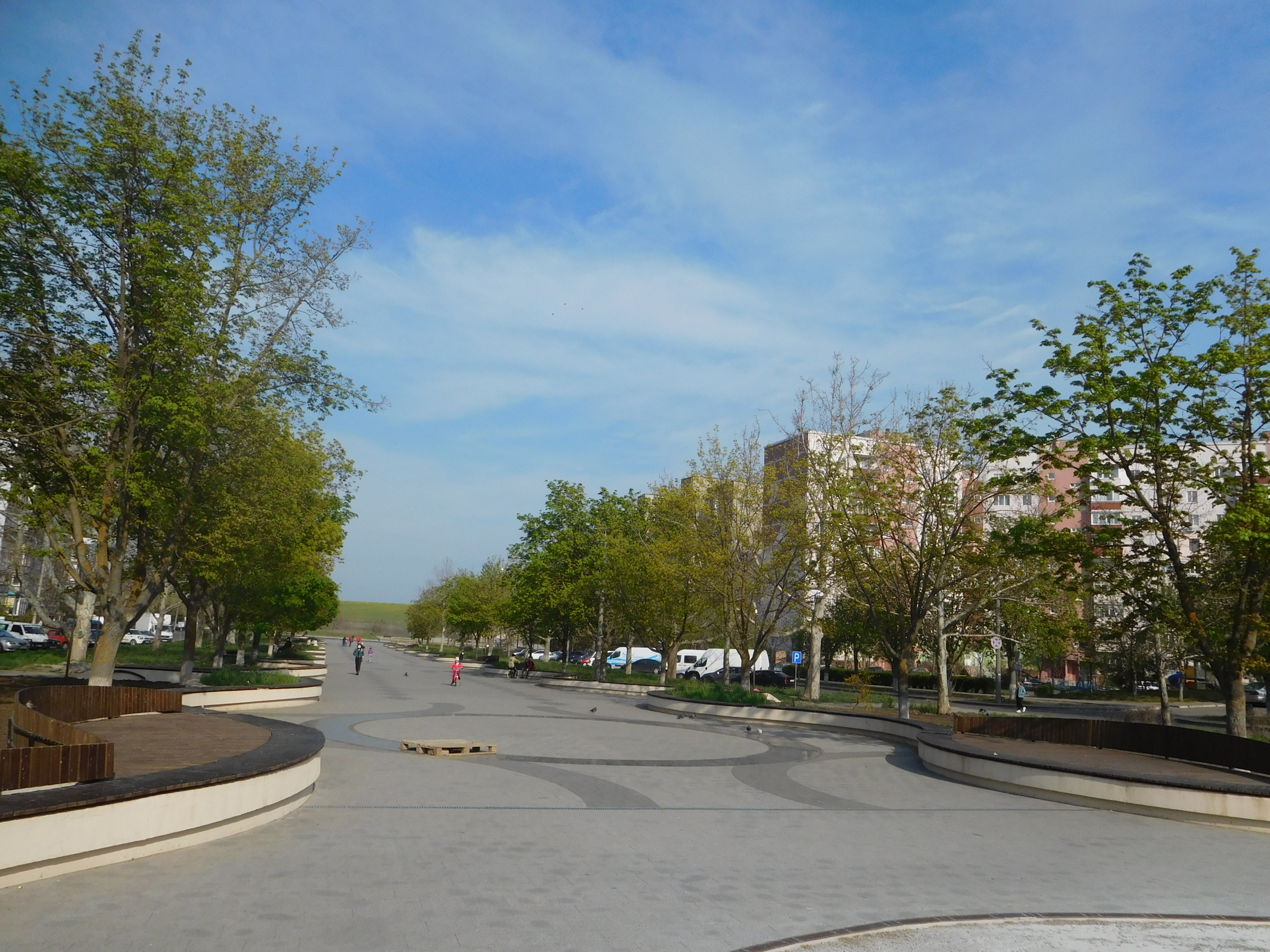
Myru Avenue

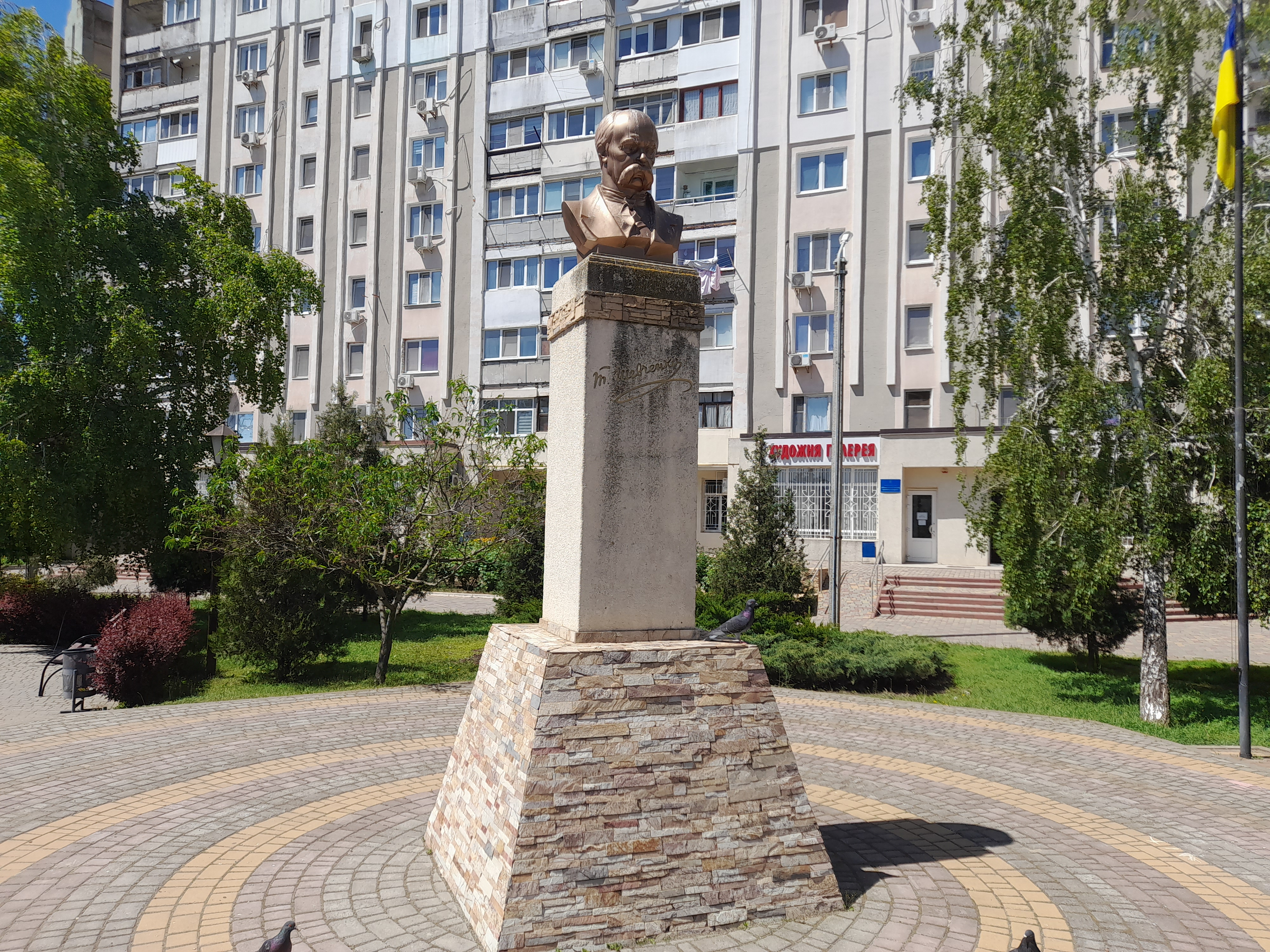
Taras Shevchenko bust

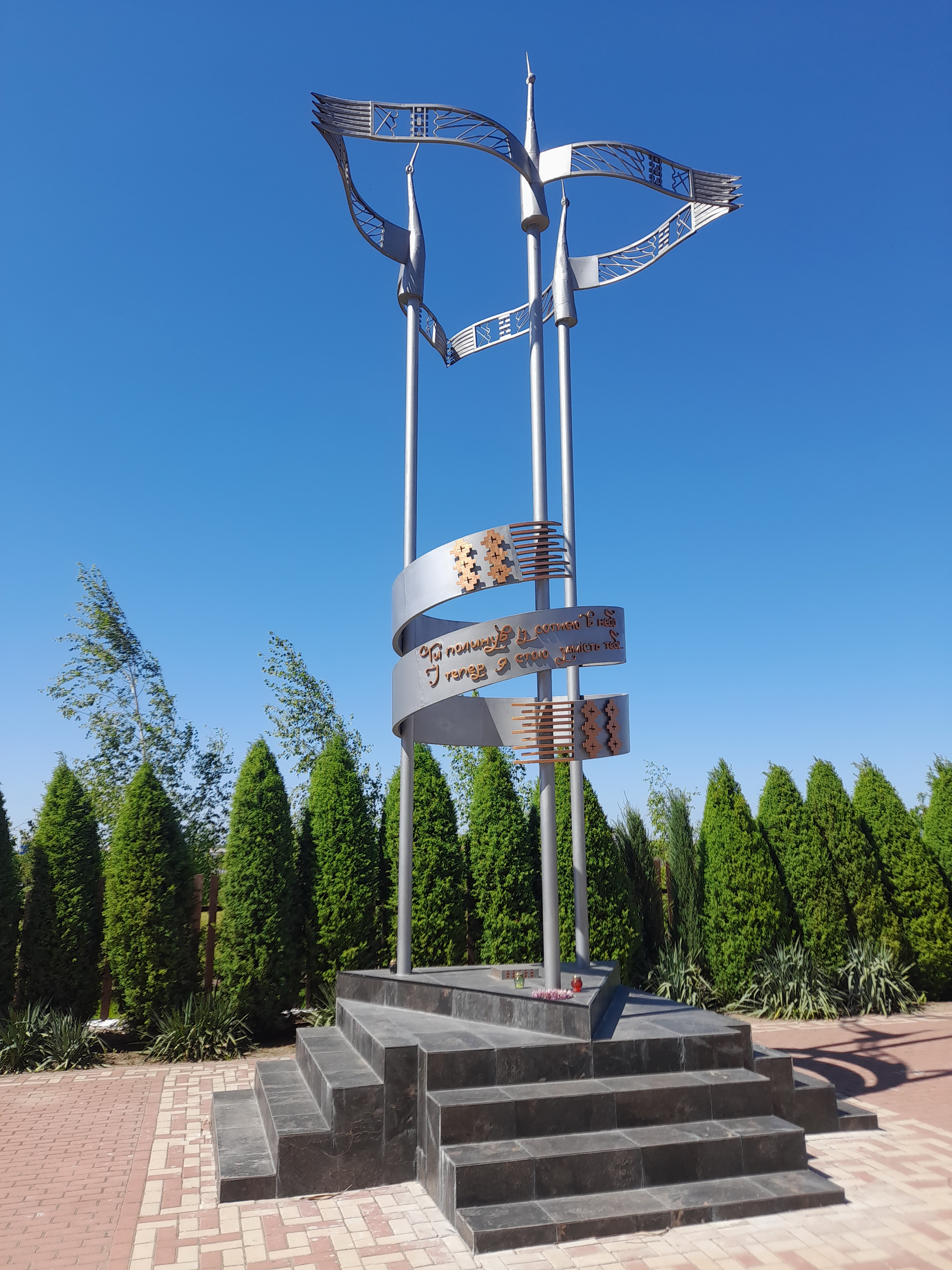
Memorial to Nebesna Sotnia

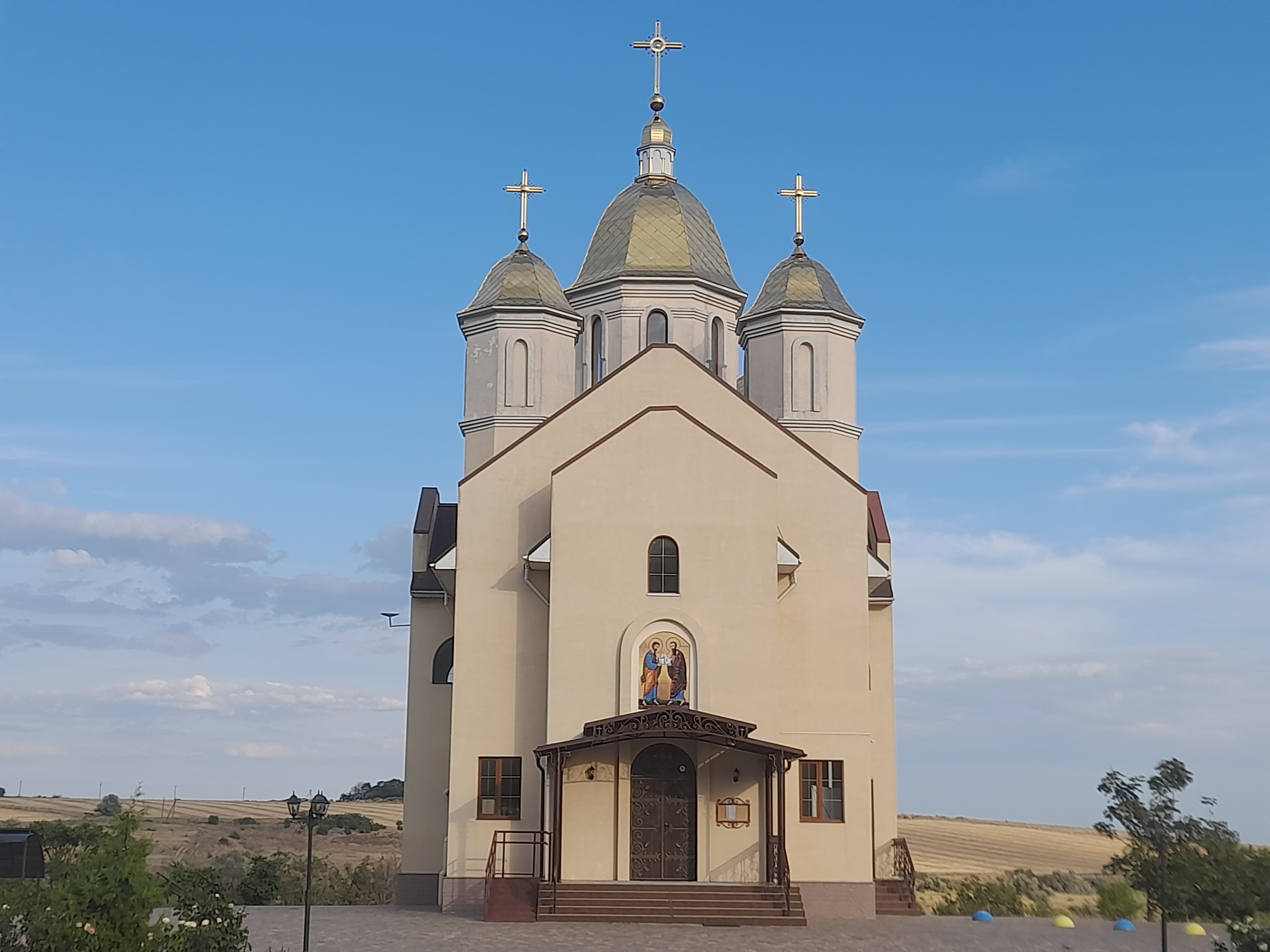
Saints Peter and Paul church

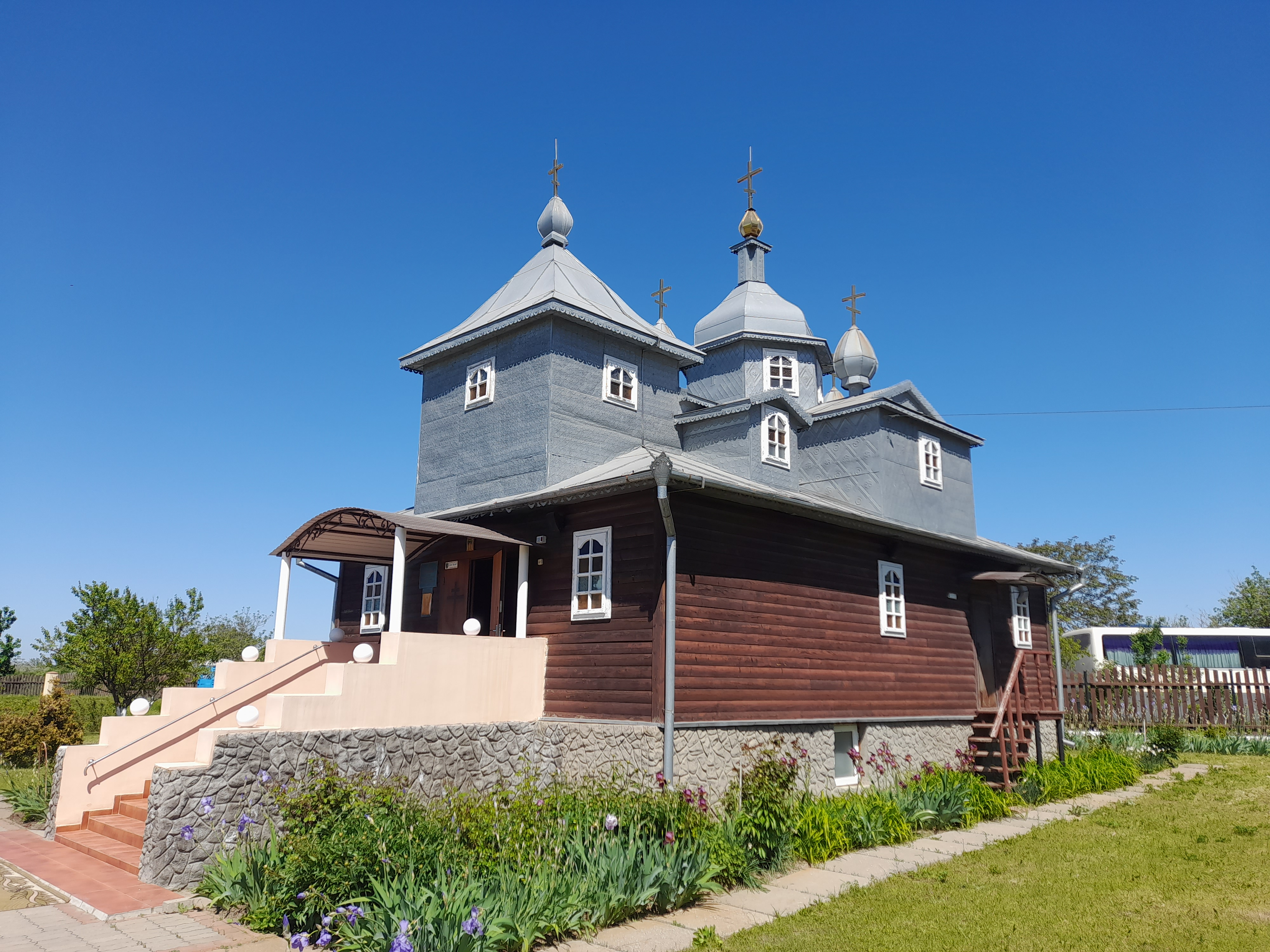
Intercession church

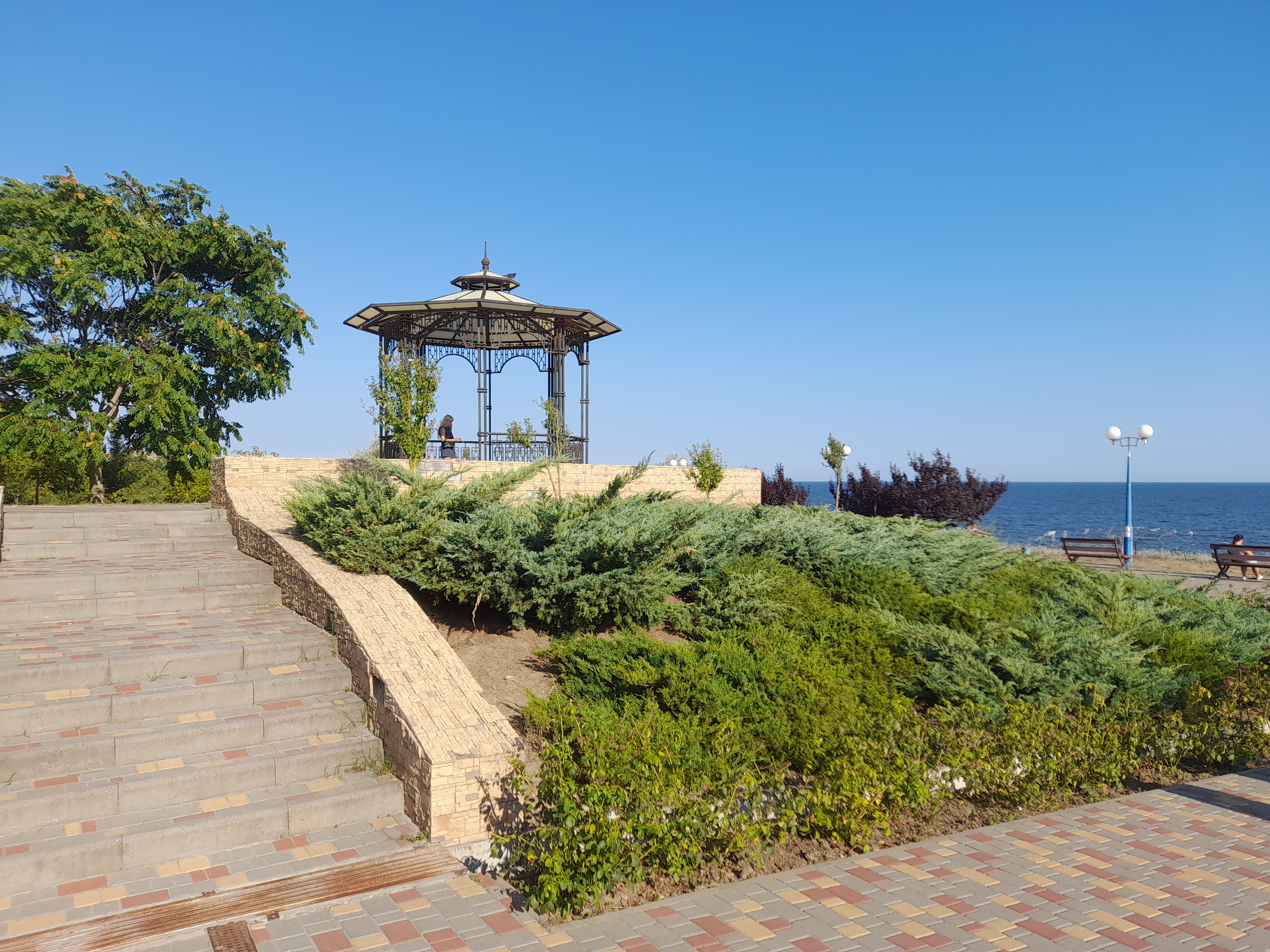
Prymorskyi Park

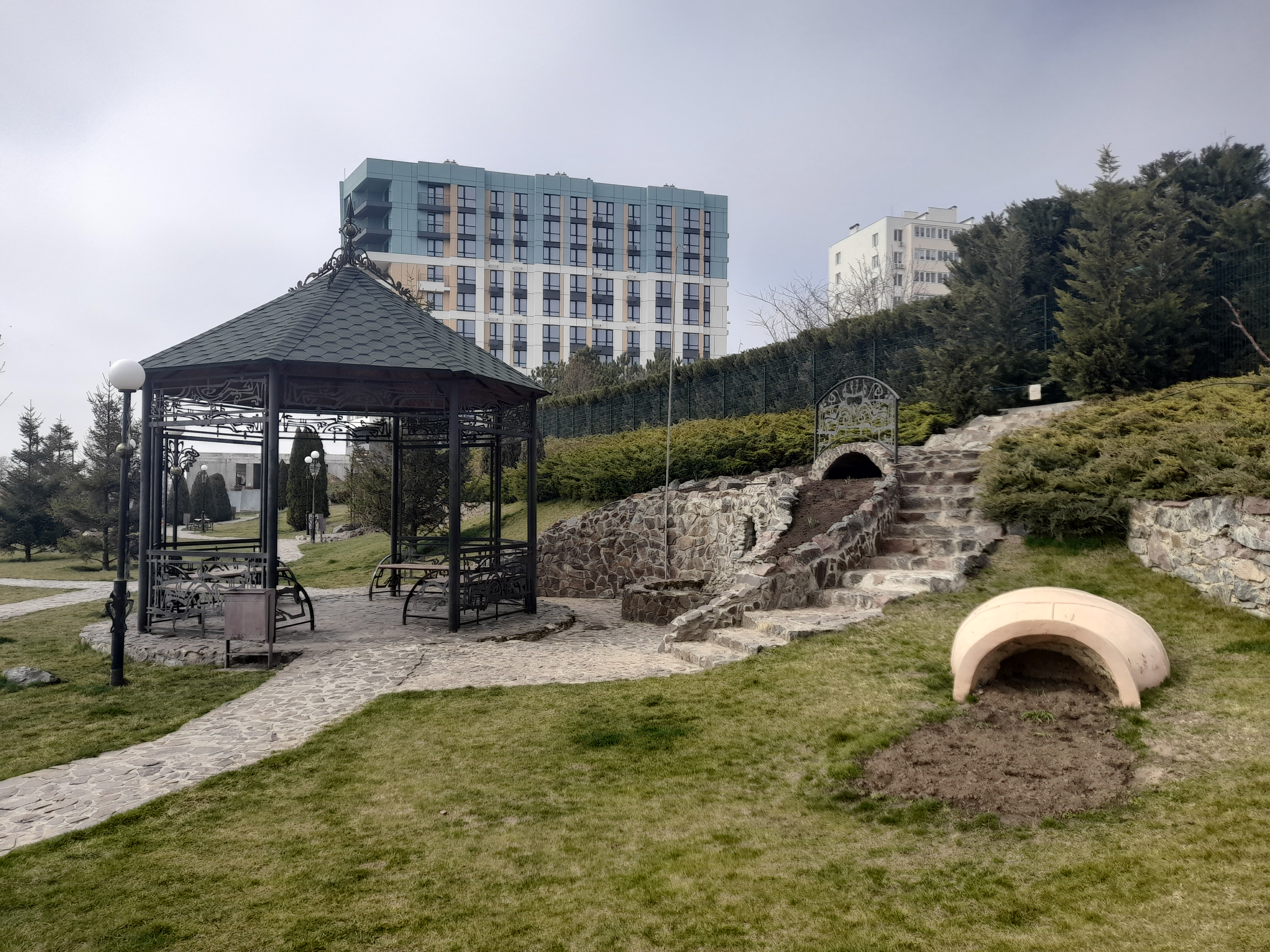
Garden "Georgia"

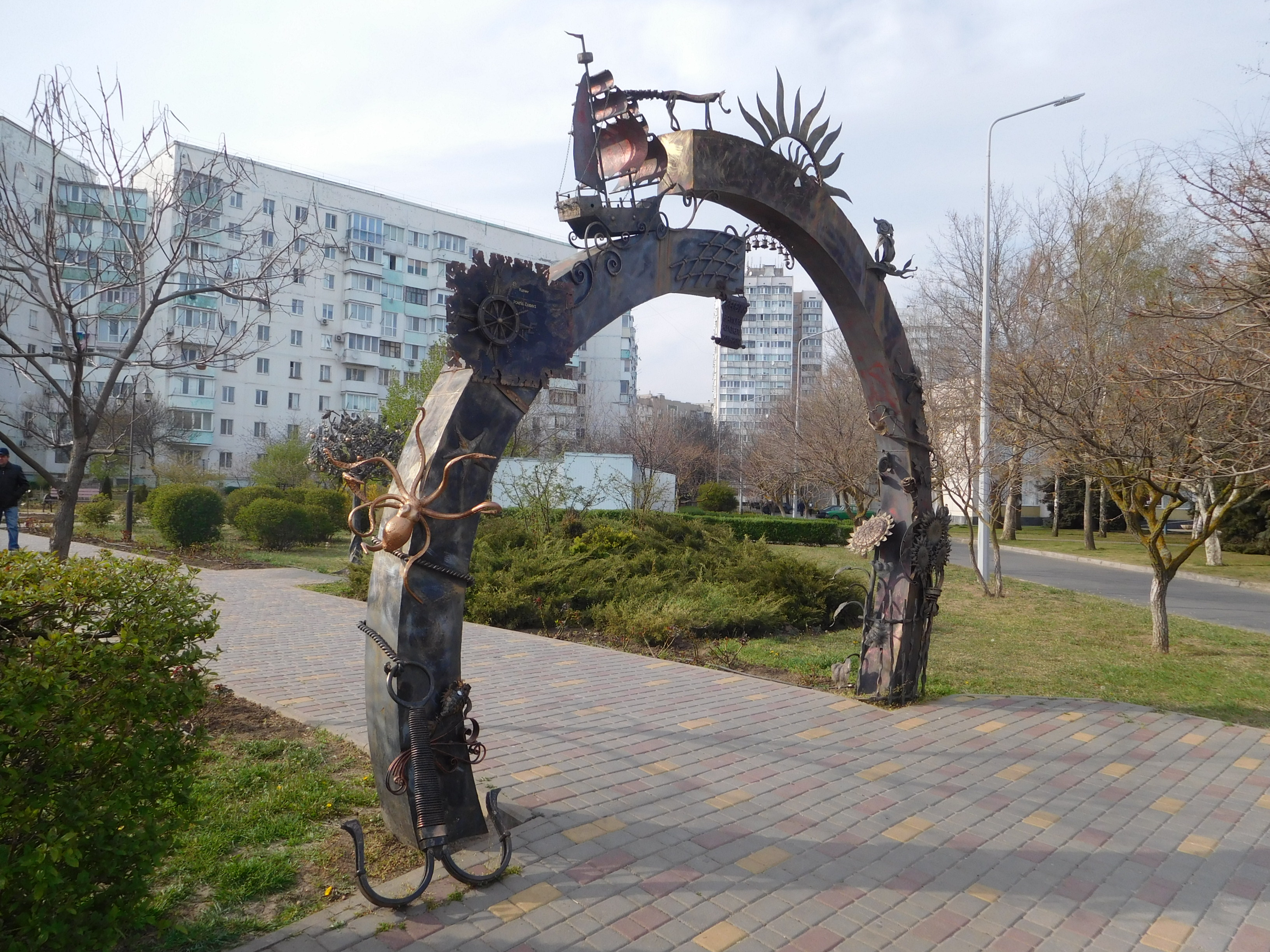
Park of wrought sculptures

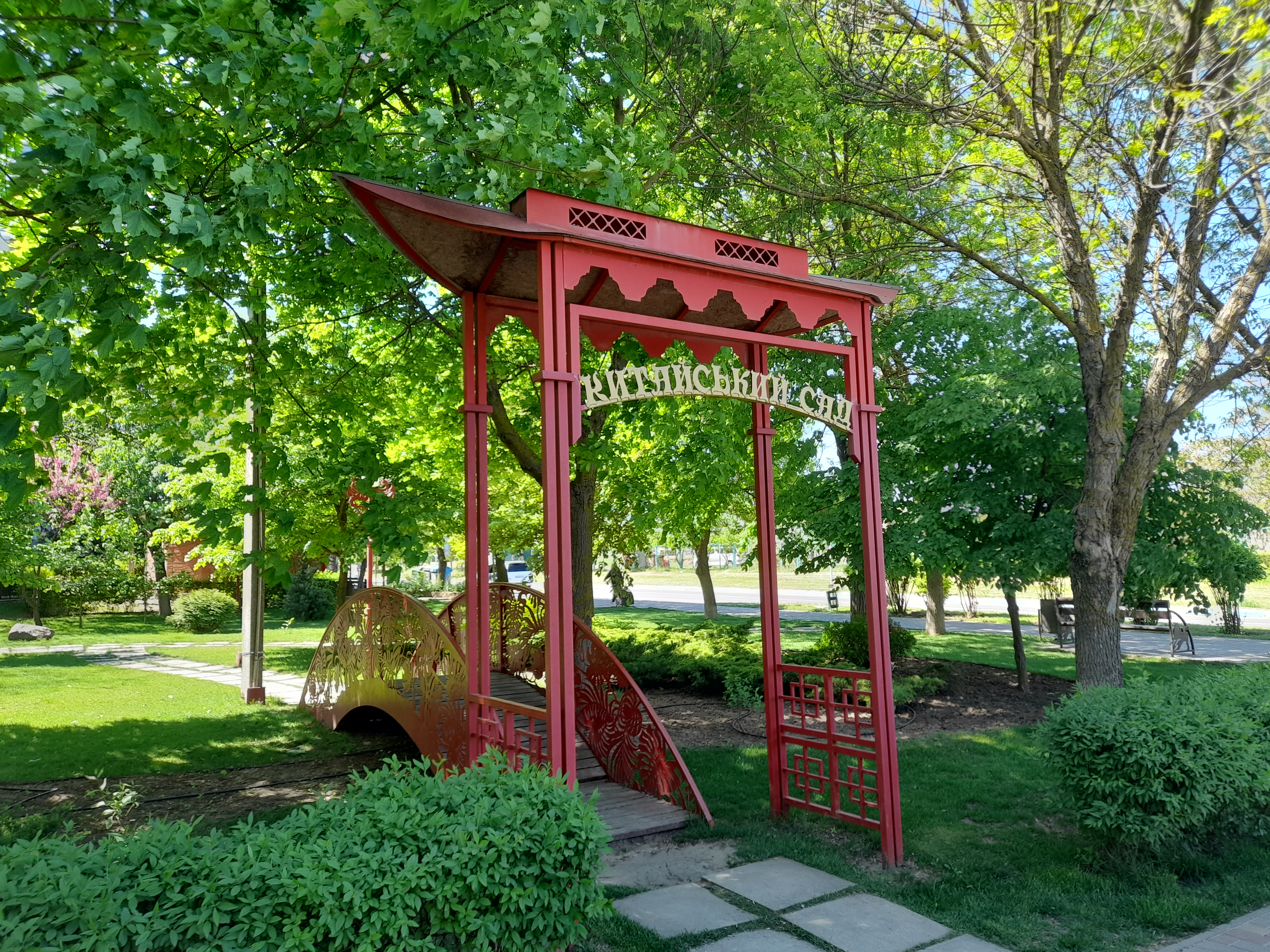
Turkish Garden 'Kemer'

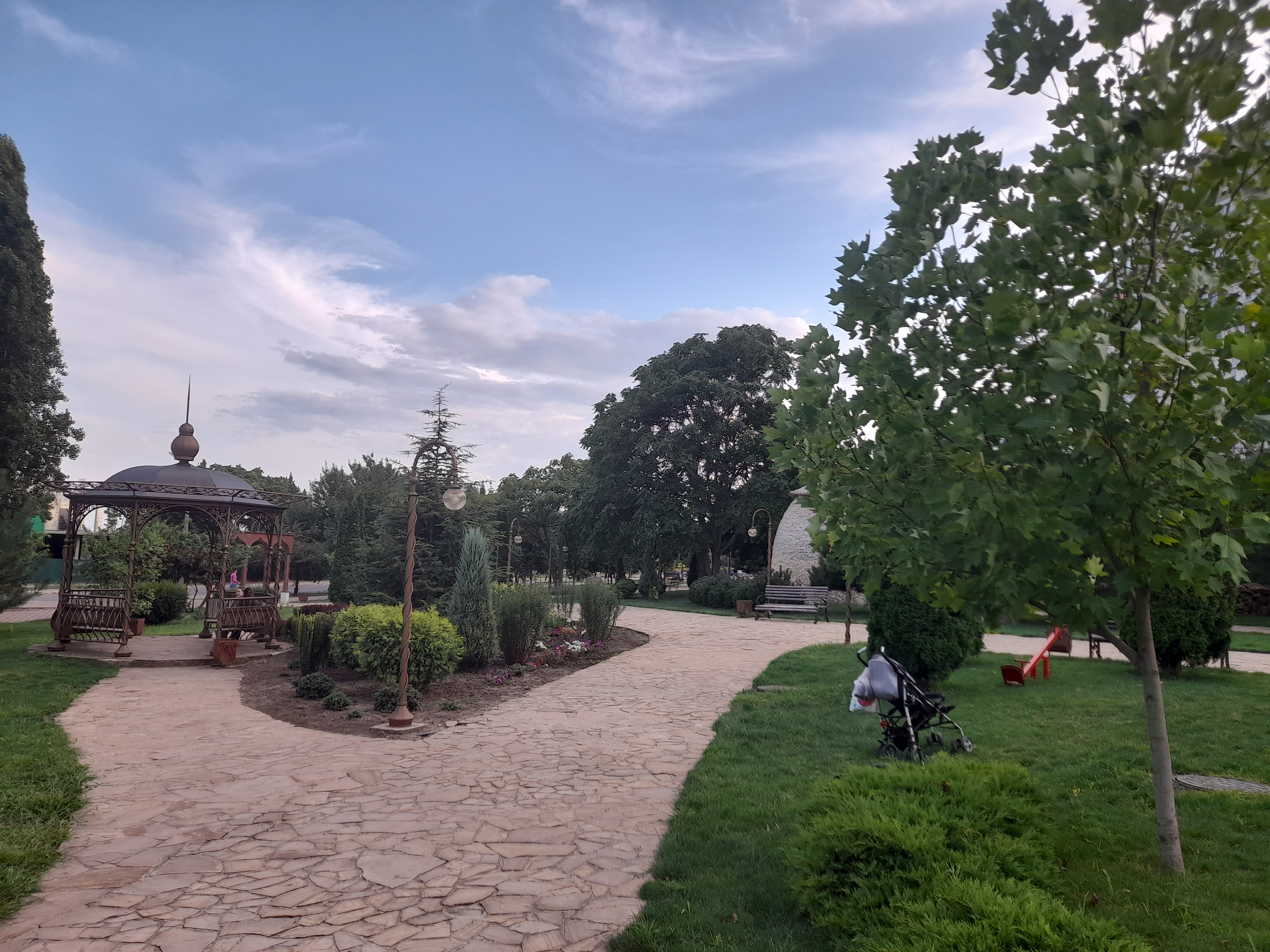
Turkish Garden 'Kemer

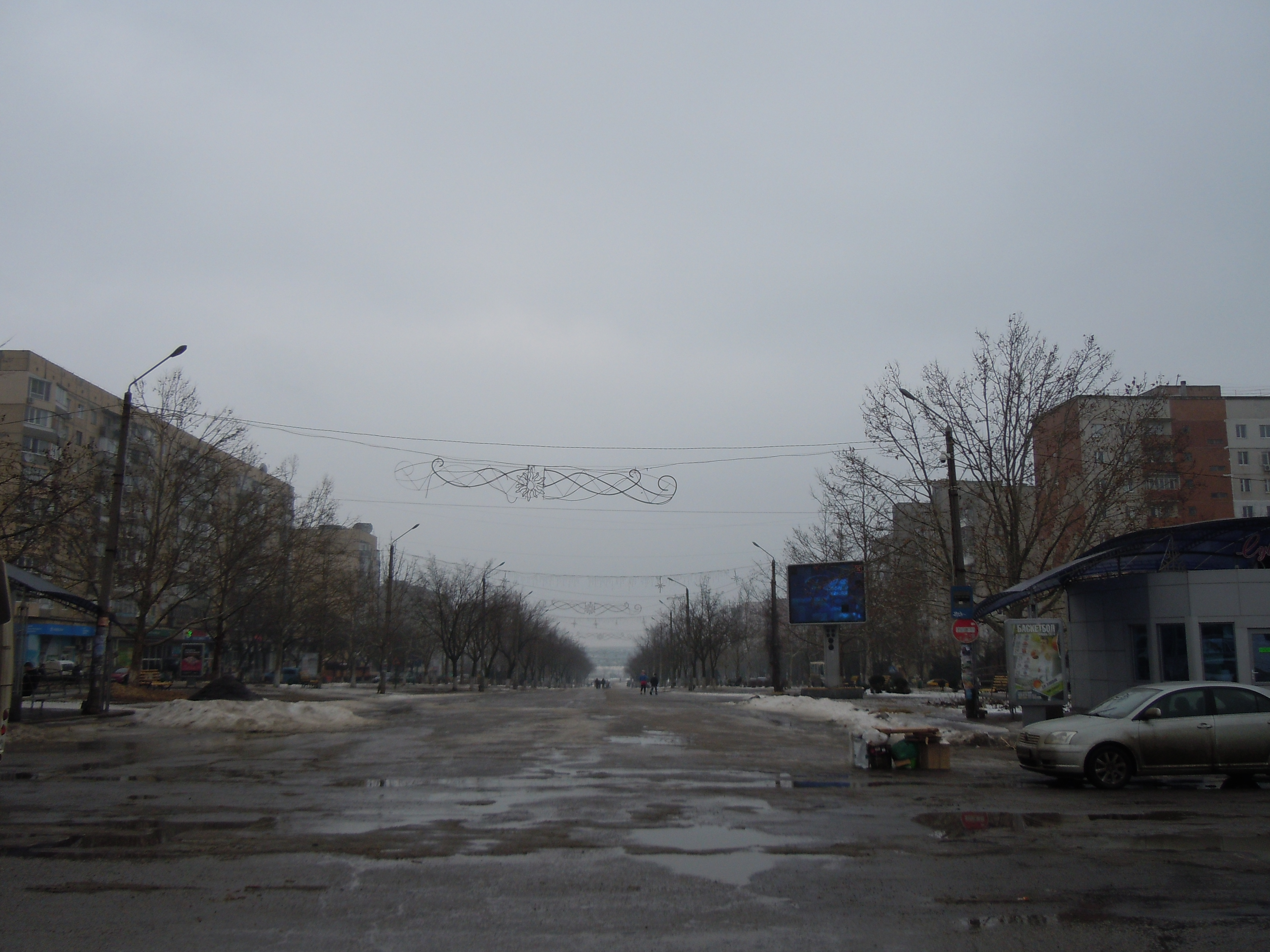
Pivdenne in winter

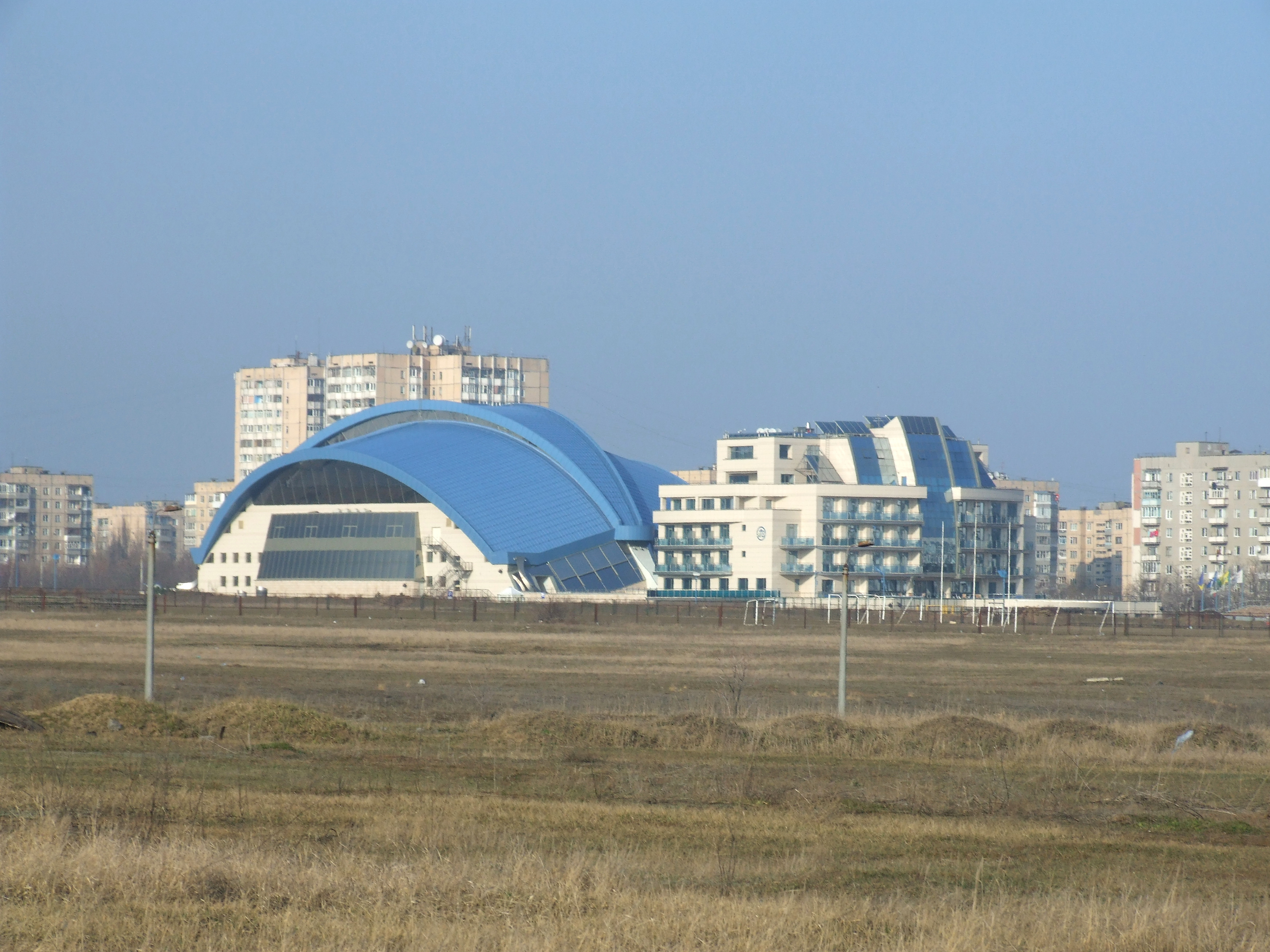
Sports complex of Pivdenne

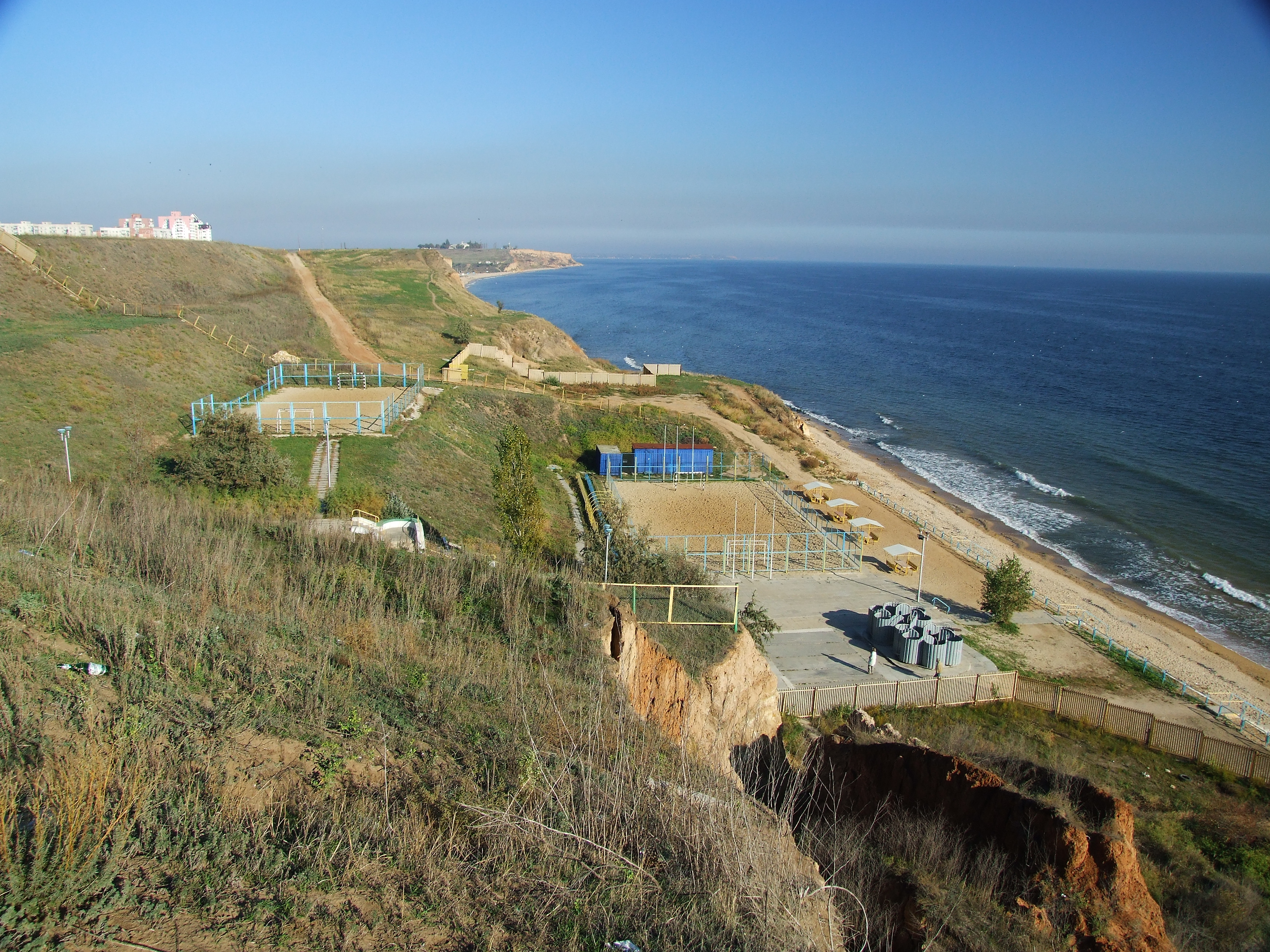
Pivdenne beach

== See also ==
- Odesa–Brody pipeline
