= Tylihul (river) =

Coordinates: 47°46′47.3″N 29°34′37.9″E

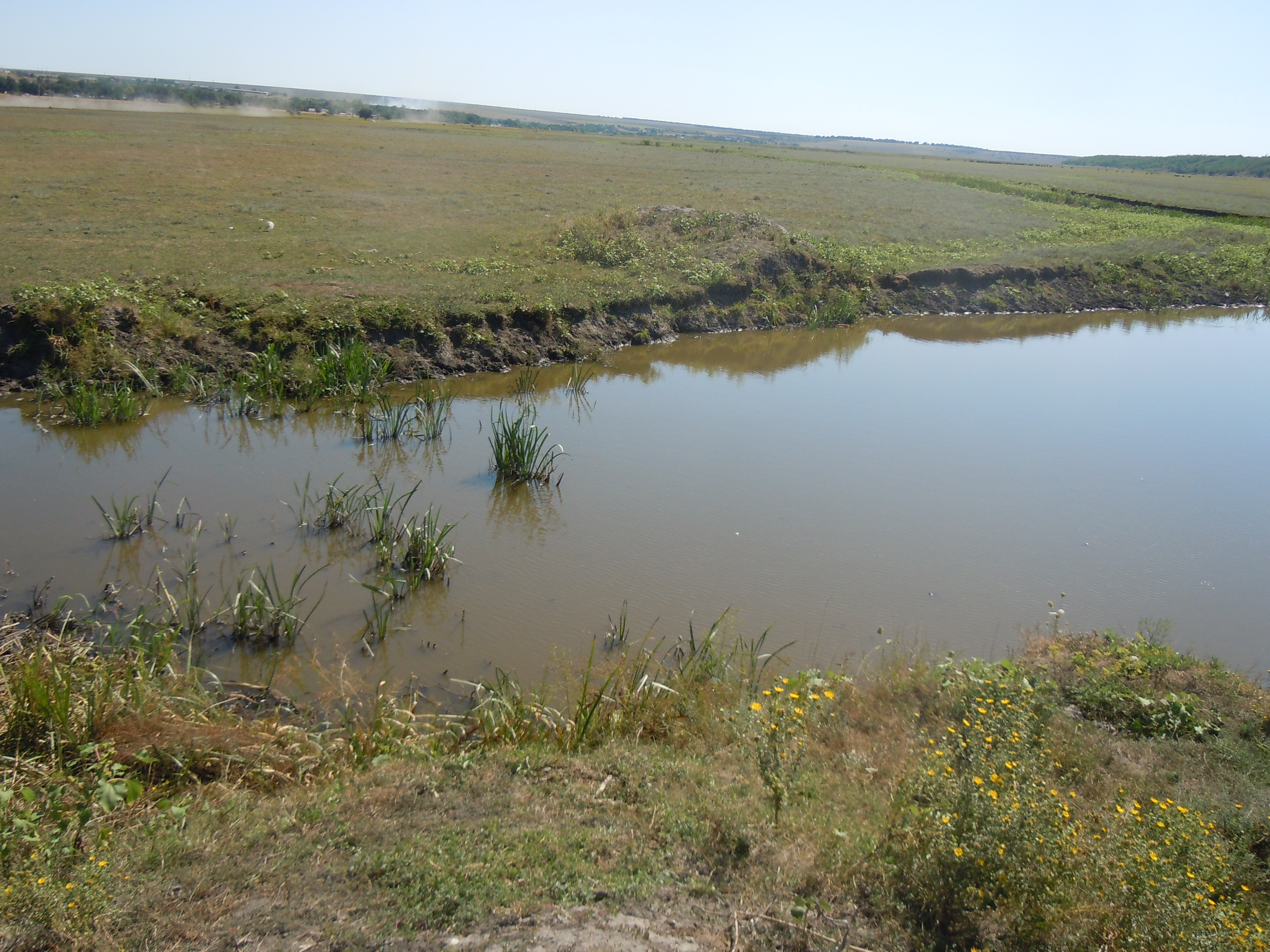
- The Tylihul River
- Native name: Тилігул (Ukrainian)

Location
- Country: Ukraine

Physical characteristics
- Source
  - location: Podolian Upland
- Mouth
  - location: Tylihul Estuary
- Length: 168 km (104 mi)
- Basin size: 3,550 km^{2} (1,370 sq mi)

Basin features
- Tributaries: Zhurivka

The Tylihul (Ukrainian: Тилігул) is a river in the Odesa Oblast of southern Ukraine. It is 168 km long, up to 10–20 m wide, with a watershed of 3,550 km^{2}. Its source is in the Podilian Upland and it flows through a narrow (1.0—1.5 km wide) valley to the Black Sea depression, where the valley widens up to 3 km. The river inflows to the Tylihul Estuary.

The name of the river comes from the name of the water body into which it flows, the Tylihul Estuary, Turkish: Deli Göl, which means "mad or rabid lake".
