= Small Adzhalyk Estuary =

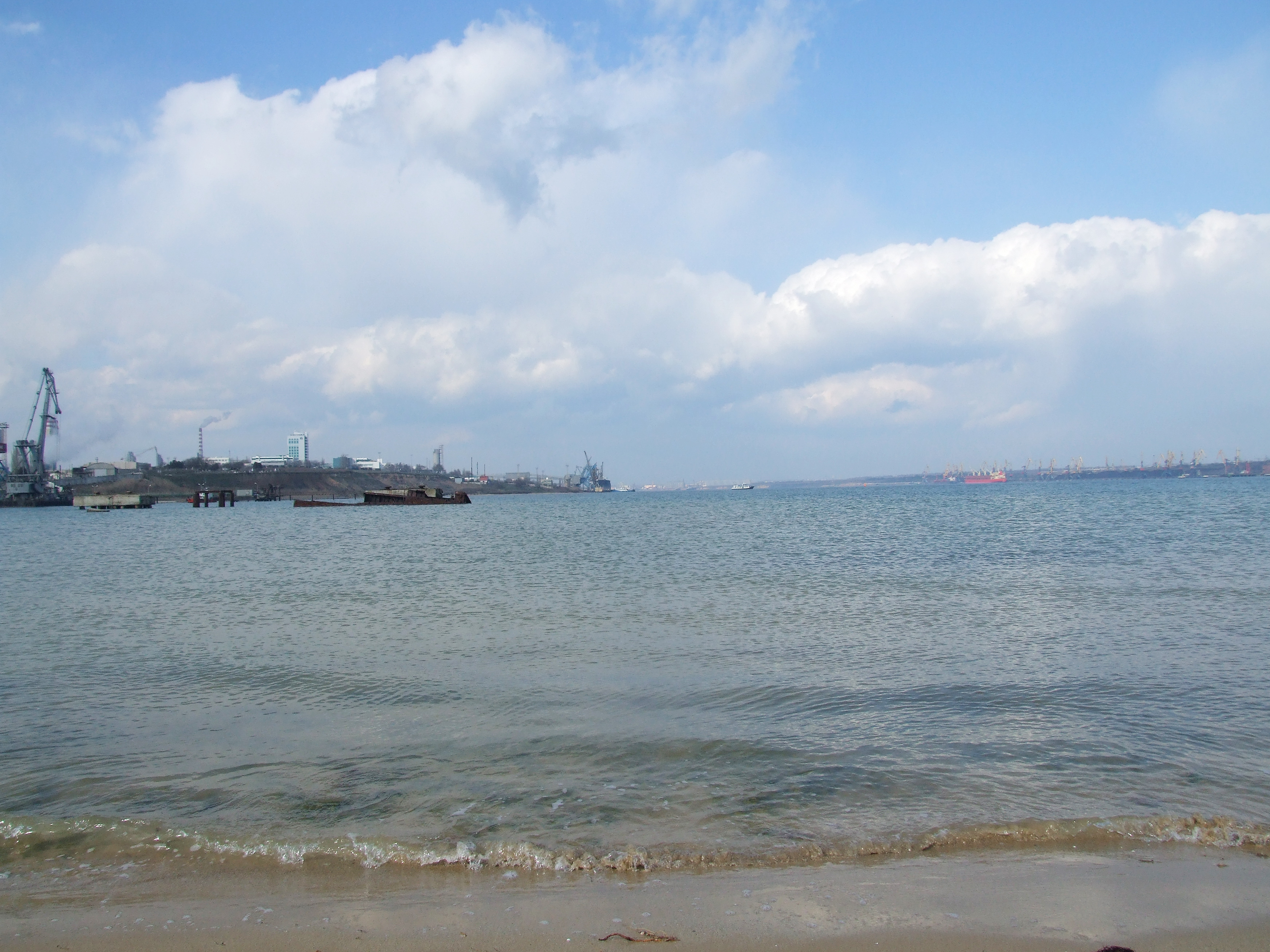
- View to marine part of the estuary

- Location within Odesa Oblast
- Location: Black Sea
- Coordinates: 46°37′25″N 31°01′09″E
- River sources: Malyi Adzhalyk
- Ocean/sea sources: Atlantic Ocean
- Basin countries: Ukraine
- Max. length: 7.3 km (4.5 mi)
- Max. width: 1.2 km (0.75 mi)
- Surface area: 5.8 km^{2} (2.2 sq mi)
- Average depth: 7.7 m (25 ft)
- Max. depth: 14.5 m (48 ft)
- Water volume: 44×10^{6} m^{3} (1.6×10^{9} cu ft)
- Salinity: 10-18 ‰
- Settlements: Pivdenne

The Small Adzhalyk Estuary or Hryhorivsky Estuary (Note: Ukrainian: Малий Аджалицький лиман, Григорівський лиман, romanized: Malyi Adzhalytskyi lyman, Hryhorivskyi lyman; Russian: Малый Аджалыцкий лиман, Григорьевский лиман; Turkish: Küçük Adcalik liman) is a brackish water area in southern Ukraine, located 30 kilometres (19 mi) north-east of Odesa. In the lower part (left bank) of the estuary, the Pivdennyi Port is located there. The estuary is connected with the sea by the navigation canal 3 km length and 14 m depth. The length of the estuary is about 12 km, width from 300 m in upper part to 1.3 km in lower part.

== Notes and references ==
- Starushenko L.I., Bushuyev S.G. (2001) Prichernomorskiye limany Odeschiny i ih rybohoziaystvennoye znacheniye. Astroprint, Odesa, 151 pp. (in Russian)
- North-western Black Sea: biology and ecology, Eds.: Y.P. Zaitsev, B.G. Aleksandrov, G.G. Minicheva, Naukova Dumka, Kyiv, 2006, 701 pp.

== See also ==
- Berezan Estuary
- Tylihul Estuary
- Khadzhibey Estuary
- Dniester Estuary
- Sukhyi Estuary
