= Tylihul Estuary =

Estuary in Ukraine

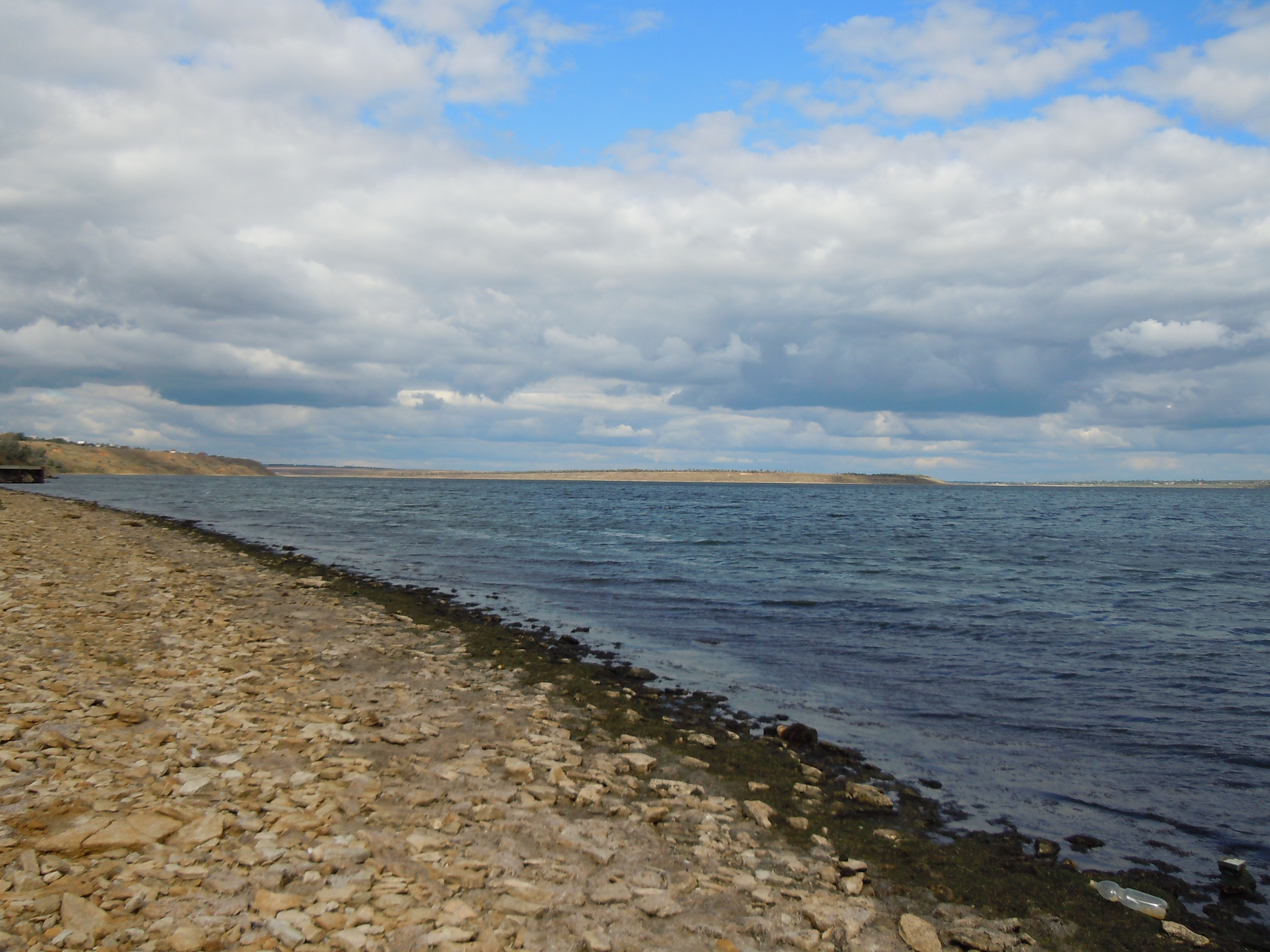
- Tylihul Estuary near Koshary, Odesa Oblast

- Location within Odesa Oblast Location within Ukraine
- Interactive map of Tylihul Estuary
- Location: Black Sea
- Coordinates: 46°46′0″N 31°10′0″E
- River sources: Tylihul River
- Ocean/sea sources: Atlantic Ocean
- Basin countries: Ukraine
- Max. length: 60 km (37 mi)
- Max. width: 4.5 km (2.8 mi)
- Surface area: 135 km^{2} (52 sq mi)
- Average depth: 5 m (16 ft)
- Max. depth: 21 m (69 ft)
- Salinity: 14–23 ‰
- Settlements: Kobleve

Ramsar Wetland
- Official name: Tylihul Estuary
- Designated: 23 November 1995
- Reference no.: 766

The Tylihul Estuary also called Tylihulskyi lyman (Ukrainian: Тилігульський лиман) or simply Tiligul is a Ramsar-listed government protected estuary or liman of the Tylihul River. Located in Odesa Oblast in the south of Ukraine, the estuary includes an ornithological game reserve and the Tylihulskyi Regional Landscape Park situated on the East coast.

The name of the water body originates from the Turkish: Deli Göl, meaning "mad, rabid lake".

== Geography ==
Tylihul is one of the purest estuaries (brackish lagoons) on the northwest coast of the Black Sea, although there are some ecological concerns related to the existence of the bottom ammoniac tube and due to intensive fertilizing of the surrounding agricultural fields.

The estuary has a length 80 km, width 0.2–3.5 km, and a depth up to 19 m. The isolation of the estuary from the Black Sea occurred in the 18th to 19th centuries. Now it is isolated from the sea by a 7-km long and 4-km wide peresyp shoal. The peresyp is covered by solonchaks and small lakes. The estuary has periodical connections with the sea via a narrow canal. Due to the canal the water level in the estuary is the same as in the Black Sea.

On the peresyp of the estuary and on the nearby water area, the ornithological nature reserve Tylihulsky Peresyp is located.

Until the end of the 1960s the estuary consisted of almost fresh water, while by the 1970s it was taking more and more salinity from the Black Sea, changing its flora and fauna gradually.

Tylihul valley creates the number of so-called valley winds, as at summer time the sea breeze winds may go much further into the continent. The local winds are usually much stronger here.

== Flora and fauna ==
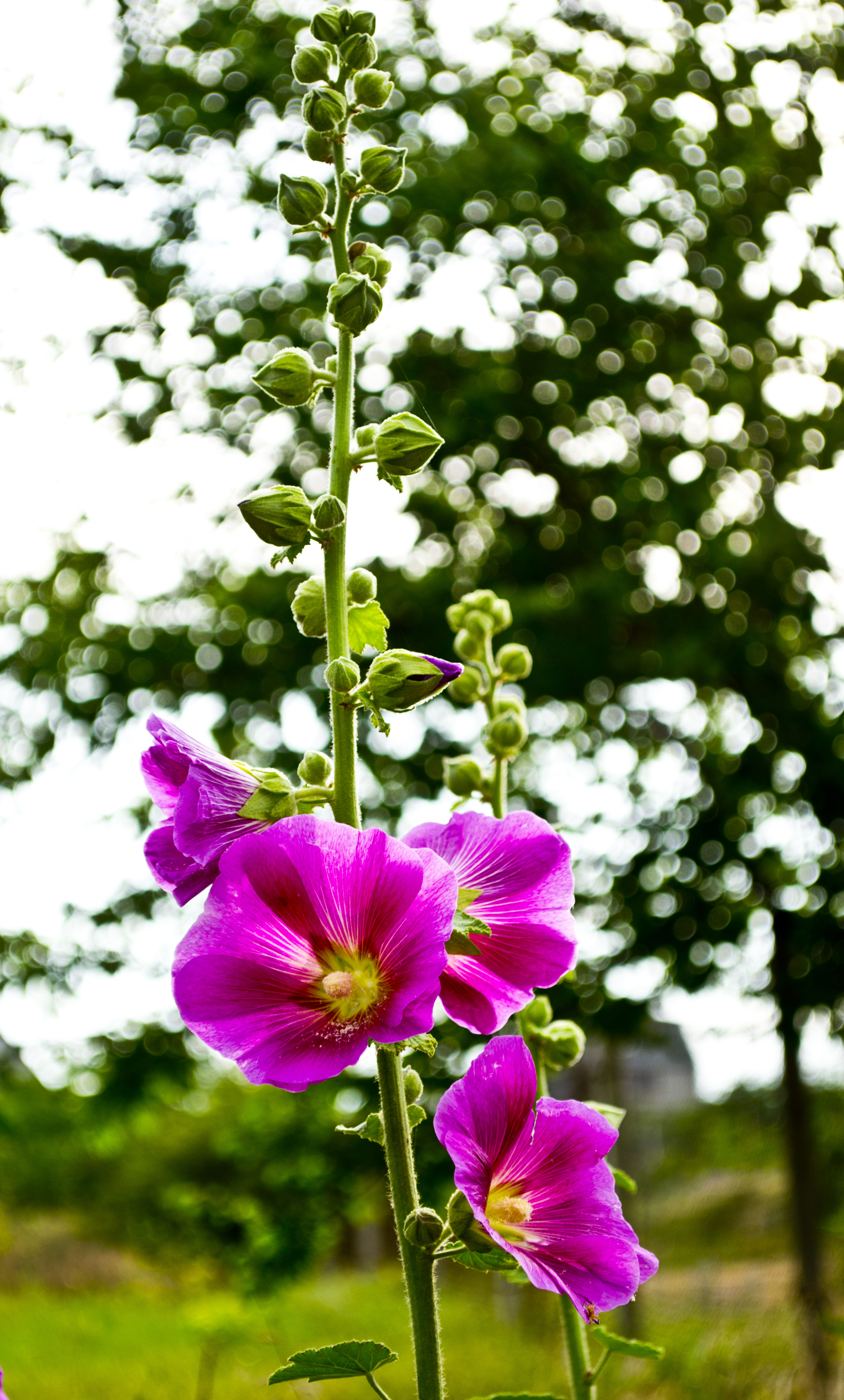
Wild hollyhock in a field near the Tylihul estuary

=== Phytoplankton ===
In total, 118 species and taxa of microalgae are registered in the Tylihul Estuary: Diatom algae – 51 species, Dinophyta – 31 species, Chlorophyta – 13 species, Chrysophyta – 8 species, Cyanobacteria – 7 species, Cryptophyta – 6 species, Euglenophyta – 2 species.

=== Zooplankton ===
There are 20 taxa of zooplankton are registered in the estuary at this time. Most numerous are copepods Acartia clausi and Calanipeda aqua-dulcis.

=== Fish ===
63 species of fish have been listed for the water body, including 7 introduced species. Common commercial fish in the estuary are gobies, sand-smelt, and Black Sea sprat. Until 1979 fish such as roach, zander, carp, goldfish were numerous and caught for fishing. Now, fishing in the estuary consists of haarder, which comes from the sea through the canal, and also sand-smelt and gobies.

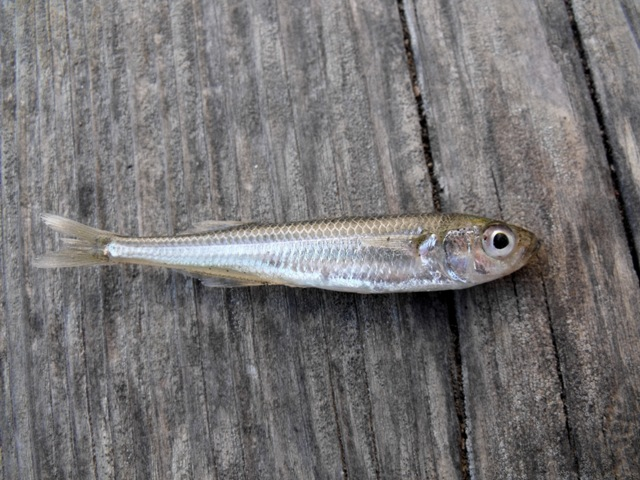
Atherina boyeri

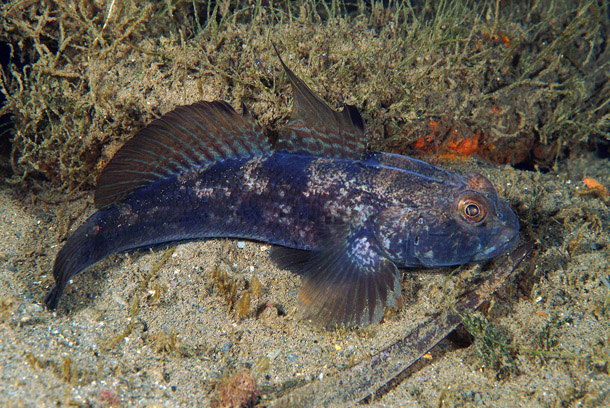
Gobius niger

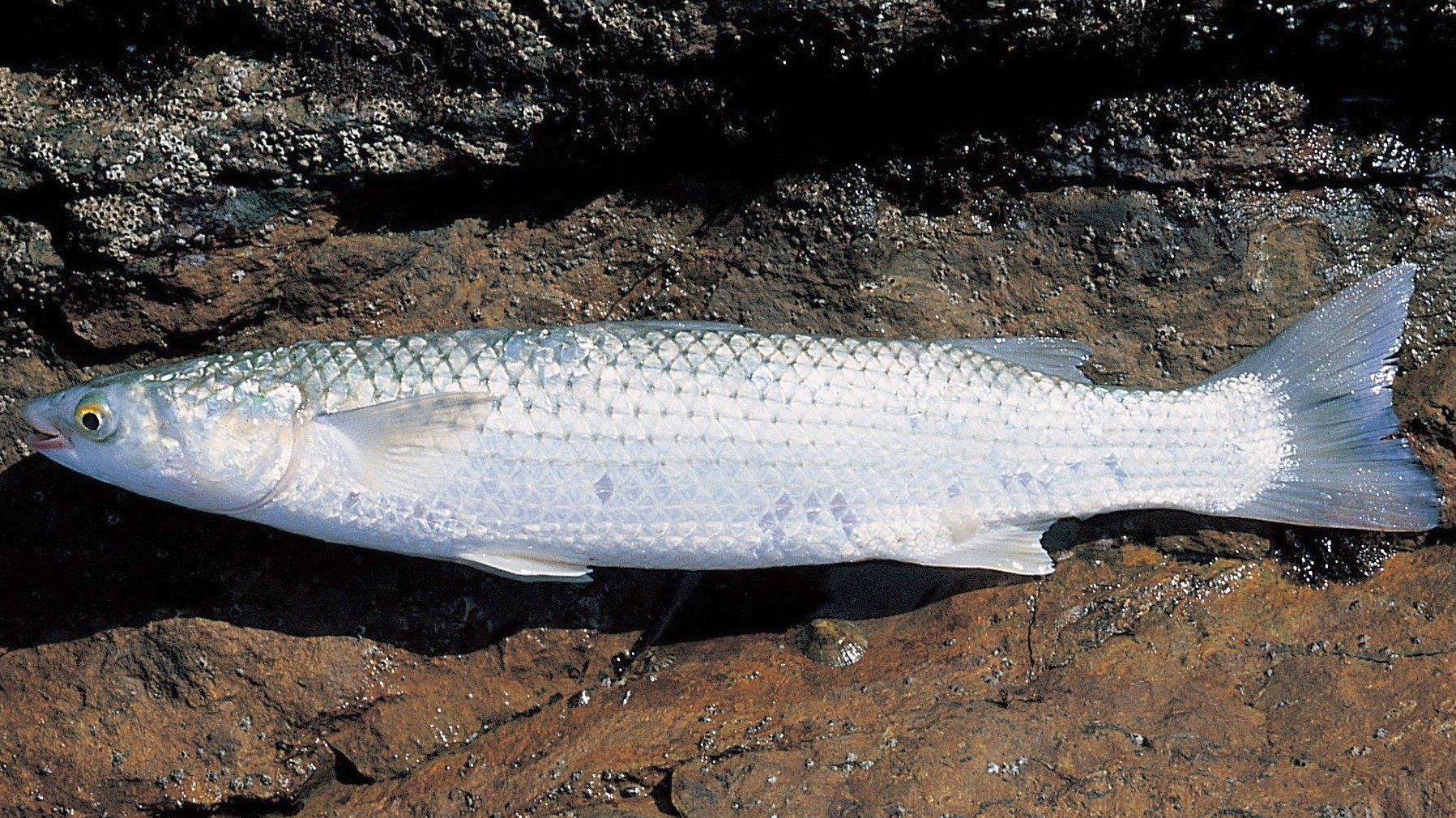
Planiliza haematocheilus

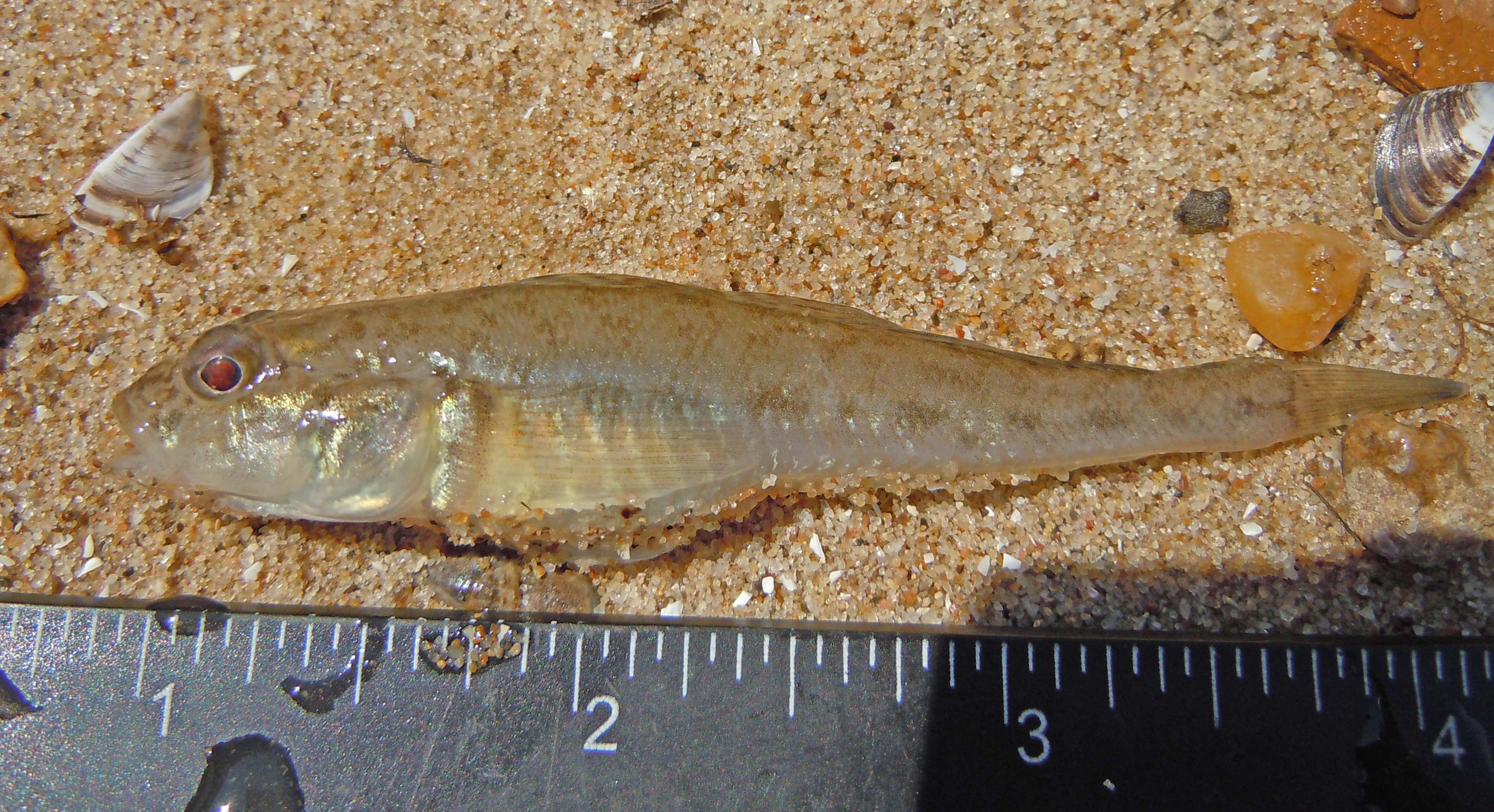
Neogobius fluviatilis

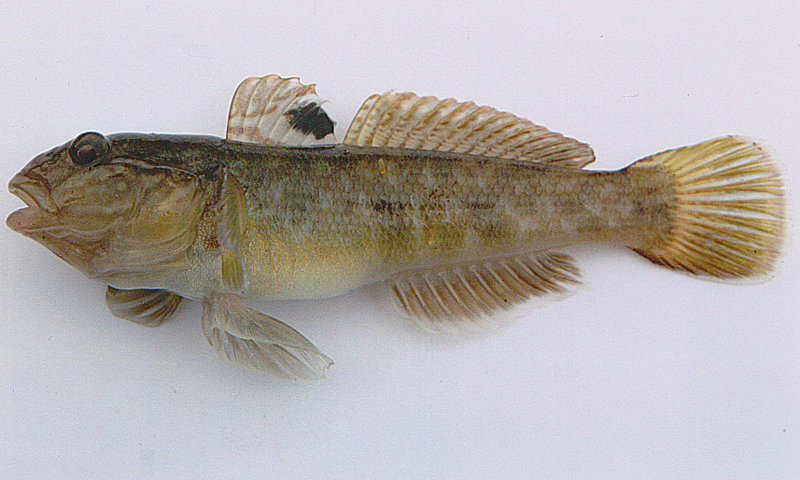
Neogobius melanostomus

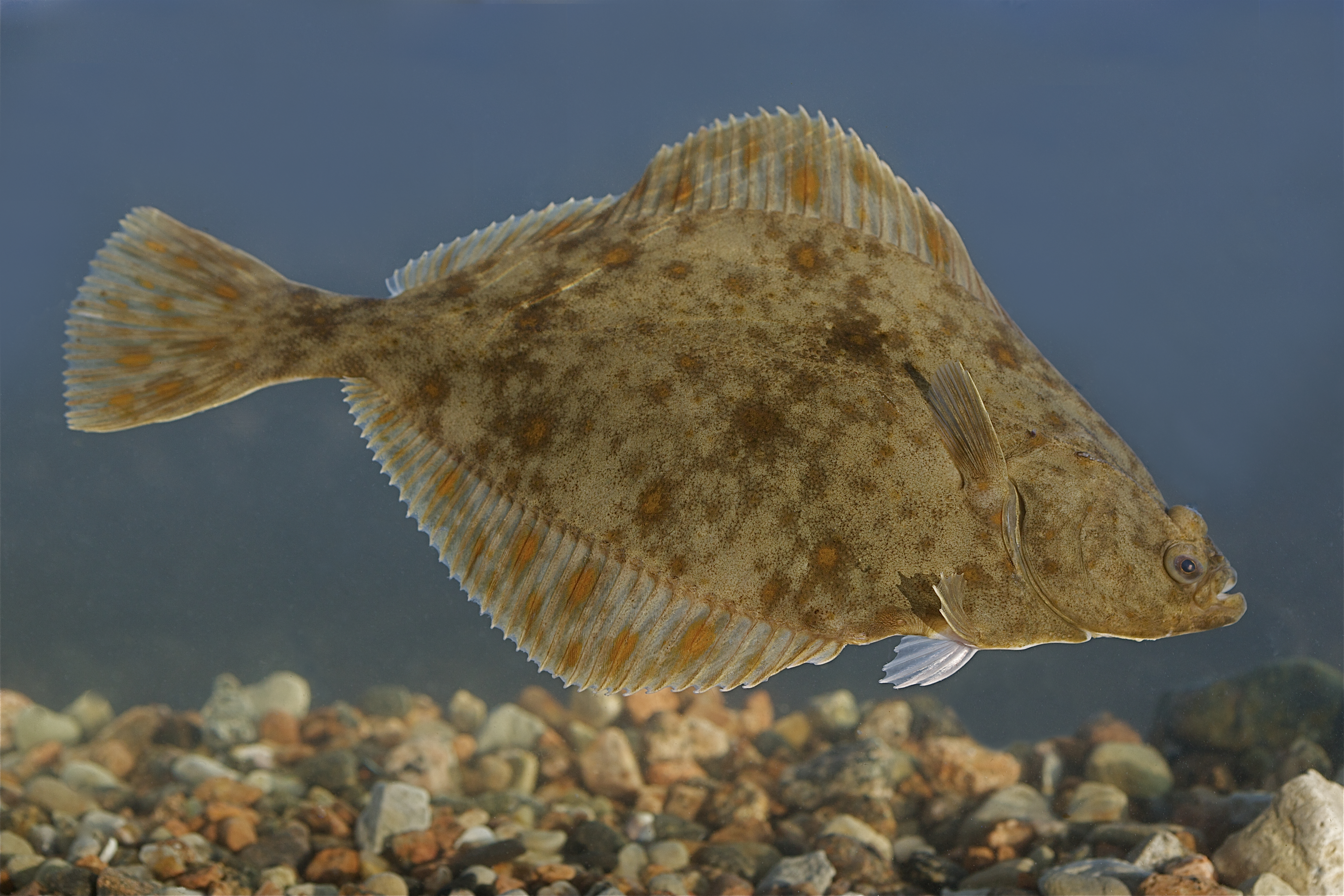
Platichthys flesus

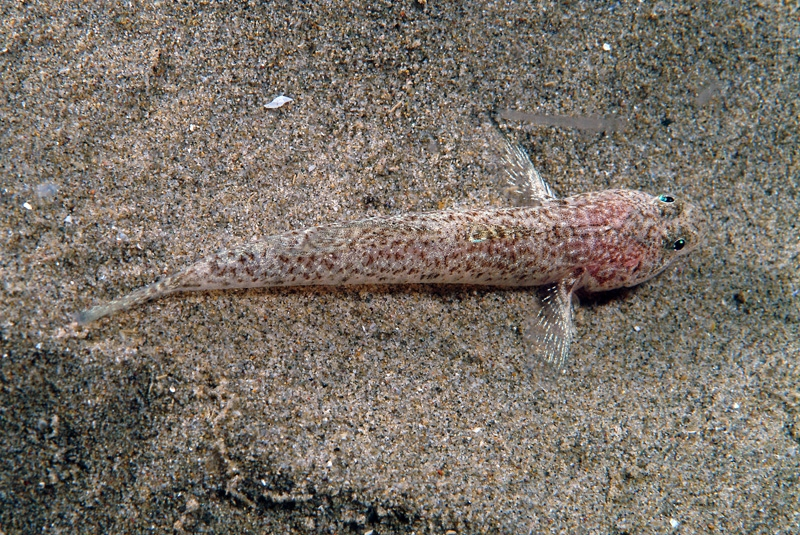
Pomatoschistus marmoratus

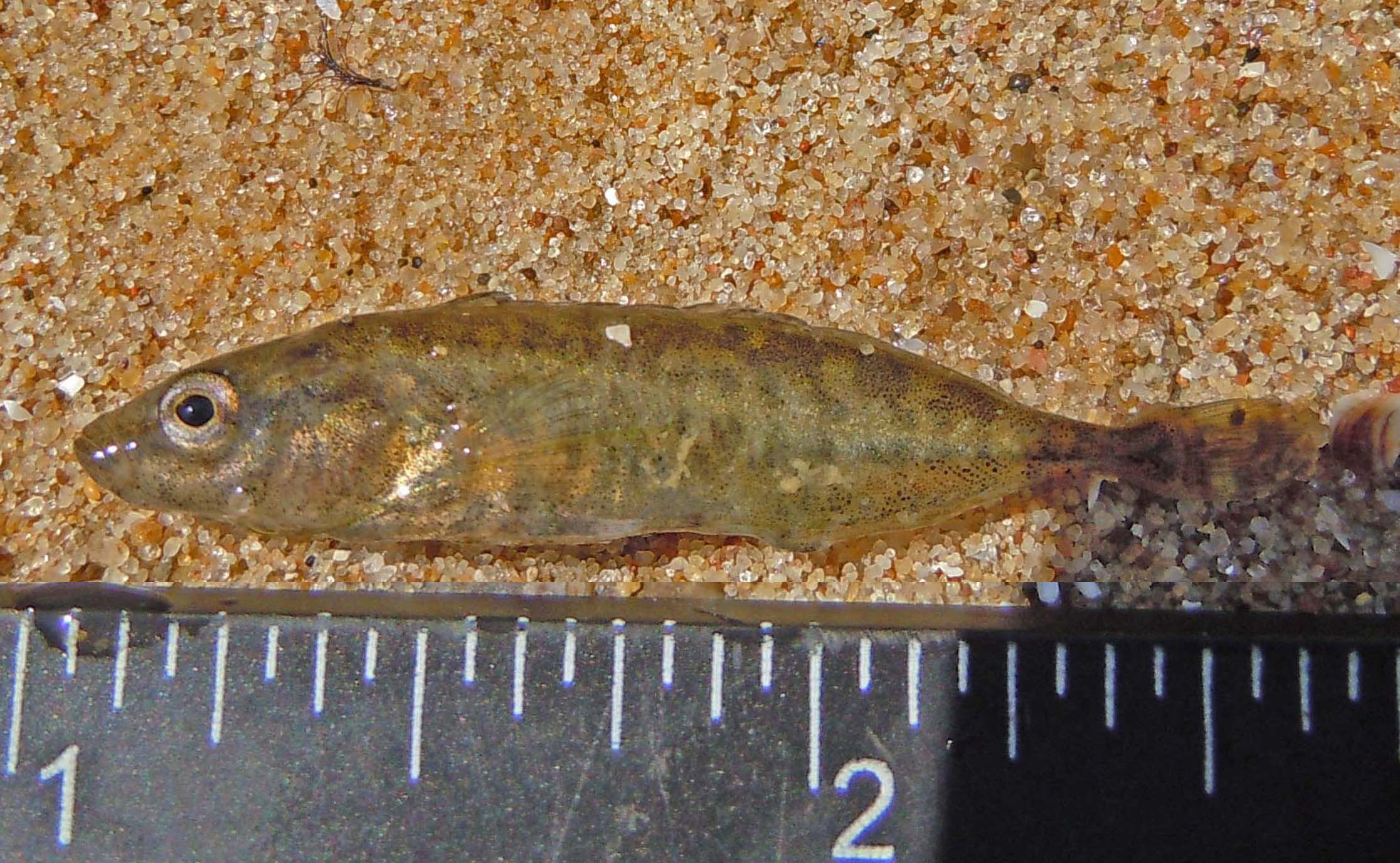
Pungitius platygaster

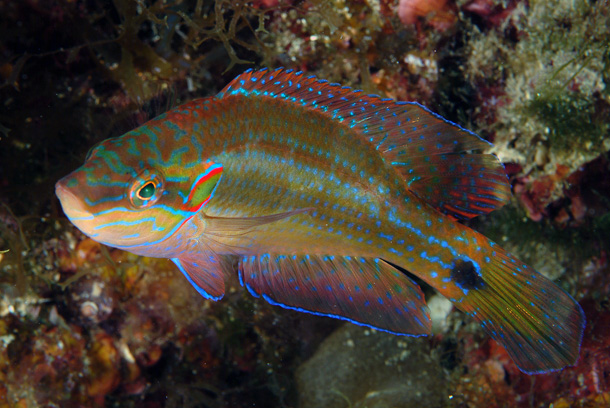
Symphodus ocellatus

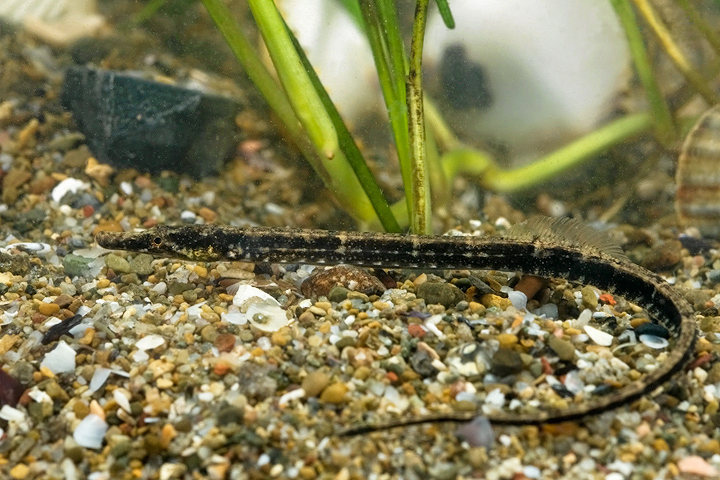
Syngnathus abaster

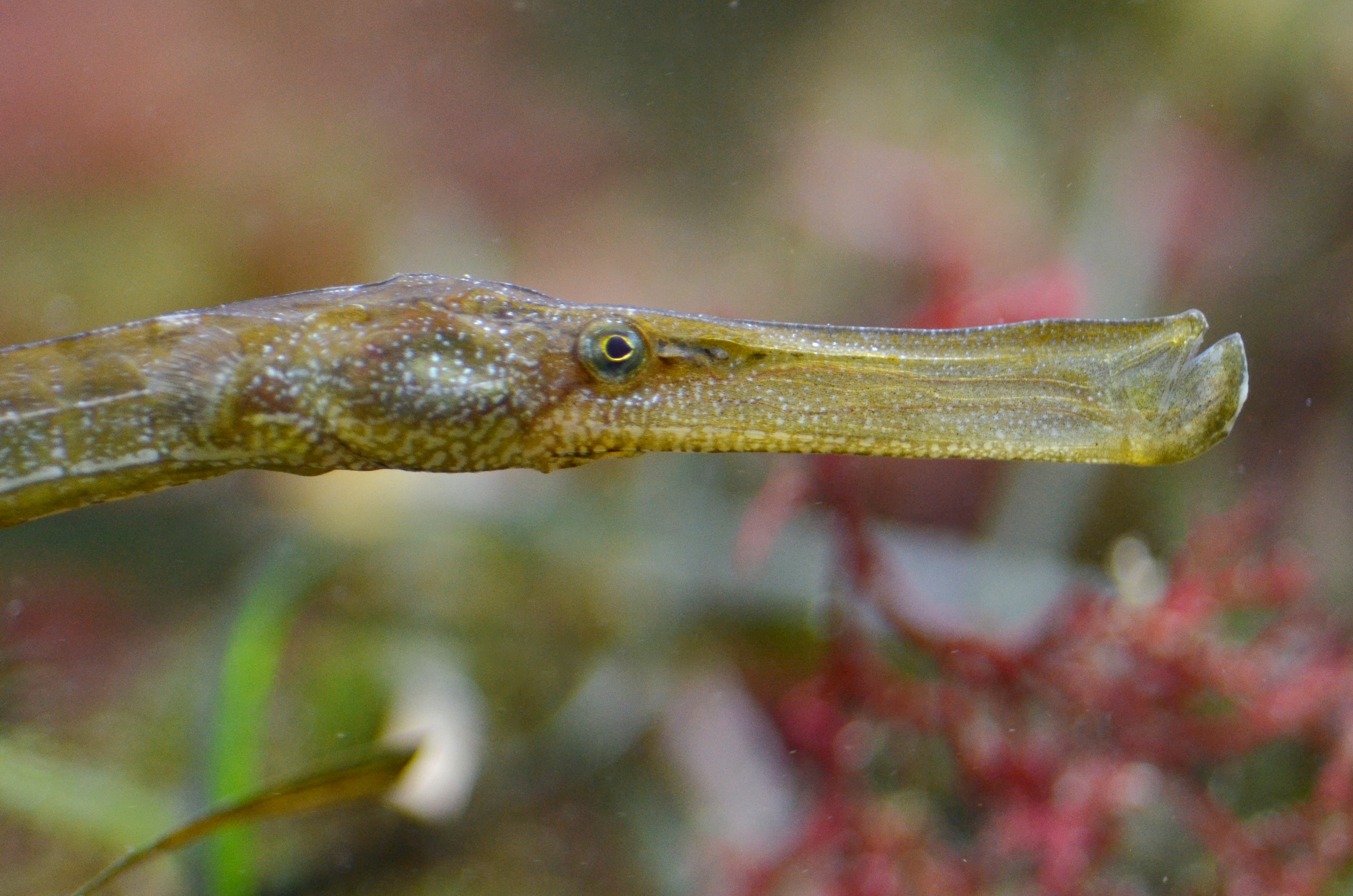
Syngnathus typhle

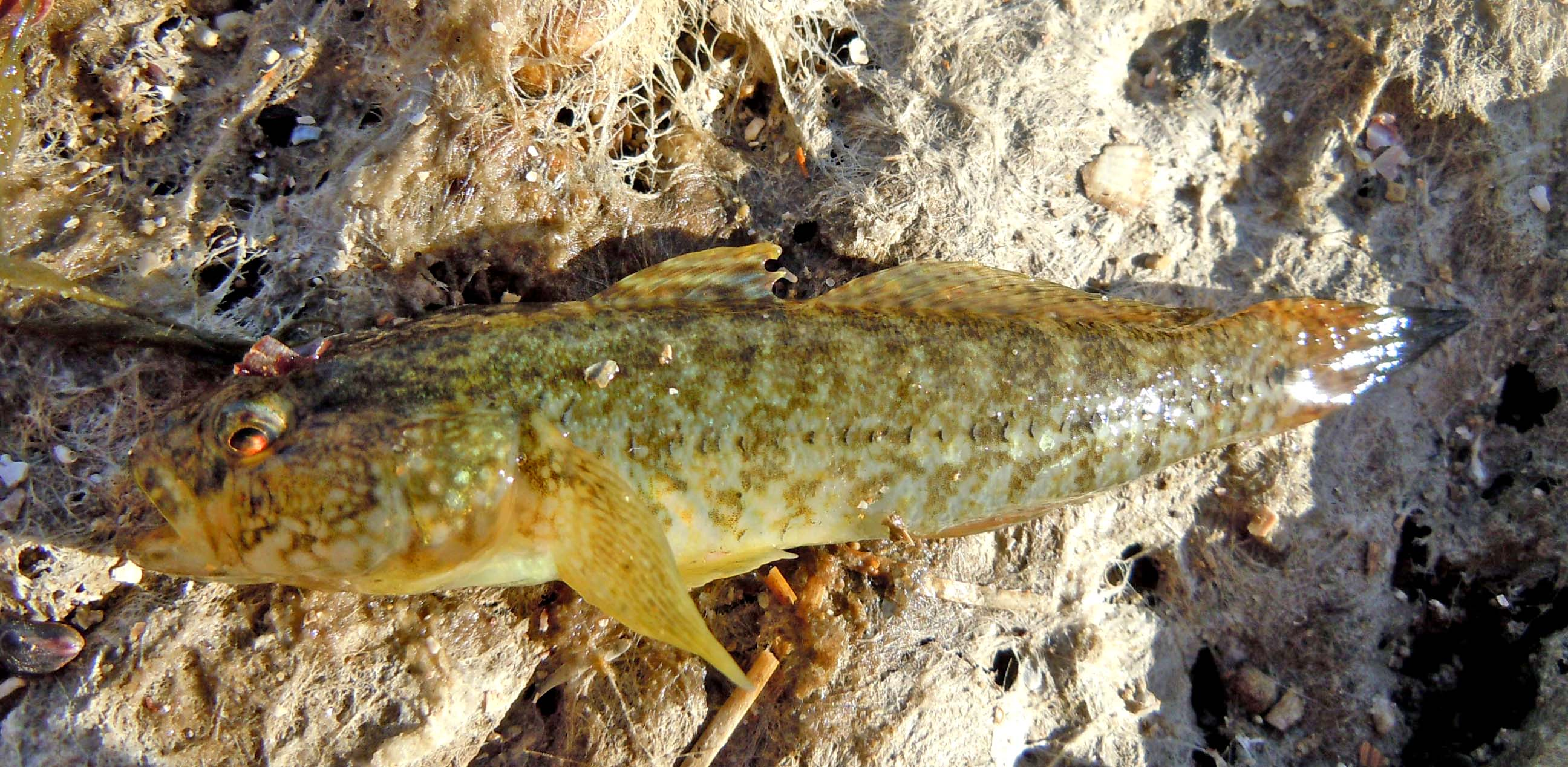
Zosterisessor ophiocephalus

== Tourism and use ==
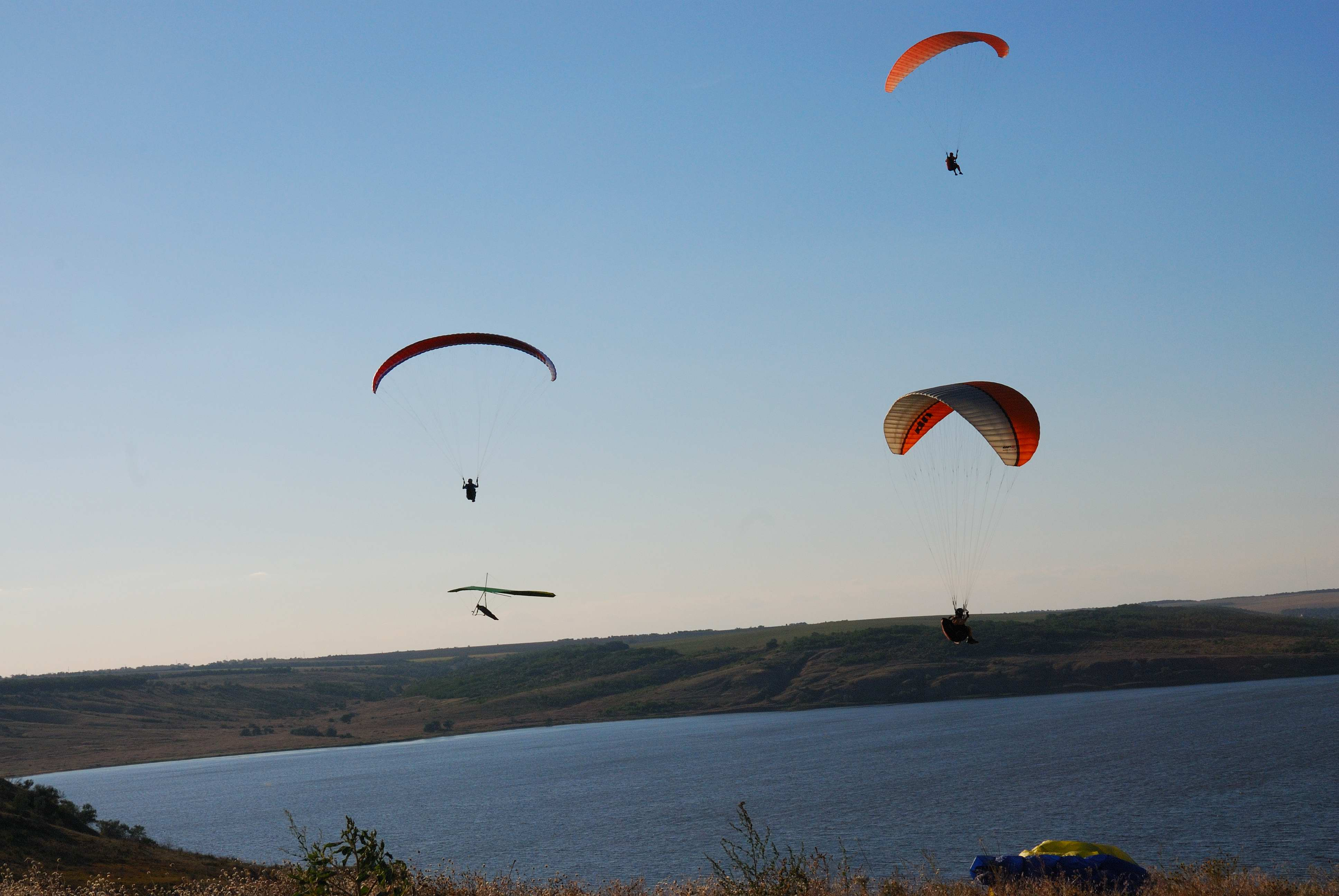
Odesa Paragliding Club at Kalynivka, Tylihul

Touristic and commercial infrastructure on the coasts of the Tylihul estuary is not yet well developed. Even in the summer the number of tourists is relatively low, though numerous private houses (dachas) were built on the western coast of the estuary in the 1980s and 1990s.

The bottom of the estuary is covered by black therapeutic mud, or peloid, which is used for medicinal purposes. The estimated volume of the peloid is about 14 million tons.

On the west coast of the Tylihul Estuary is a village Petrivka, previously Pokrovske, where the castle of Ivan Kuris is located.

The estuary of Tylihul is well-suited for many out-door activities, such as kitesurfing and windsurfing, annual international competitions are held on the east coast. Mountain-biking is also popular, and "Kalynivka" (informally called by locals "the Jug"), located in the Gulf of Kairy is the most popular paragliding site in Southern Ukraine and Odesa Oblast.

== See also ==
- Berezan Estuary
- Khadzhibey Estuary
- Small Adzhalyk Estuary
- Dniester Estuary
- Sukhyi Estuary

== Notes and references ==
=== References ===
- Starushenko L.I., Bushuyev S.G. (2001) Prichernomorskiye limany Odeschiny i ih rybohoziaystvennoye znacheniye. Astroprint, Odesa, 151 pp. (in Russian)
- North-western Black Sea: biology and ecology, Eds.: Y.P. Zaitsev, B.G. Aleksandrov, G.G. Minicheva, Naukova Dumka, Kyiv, 2006, 701 pp.
