= Odesa =

City and administrative center of Odesa Oblast, Ukraine

Odesa Одеса Odessa
- City
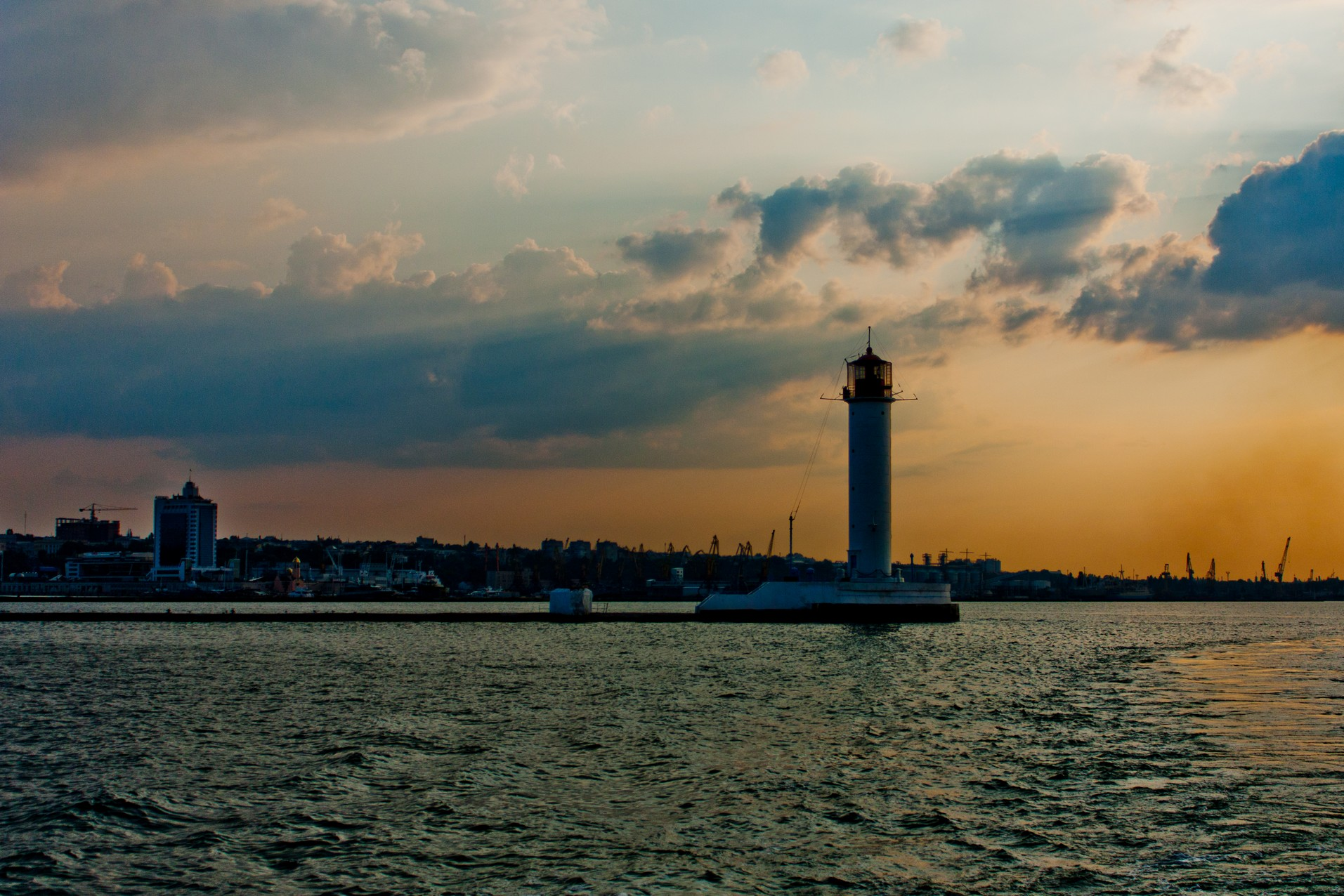
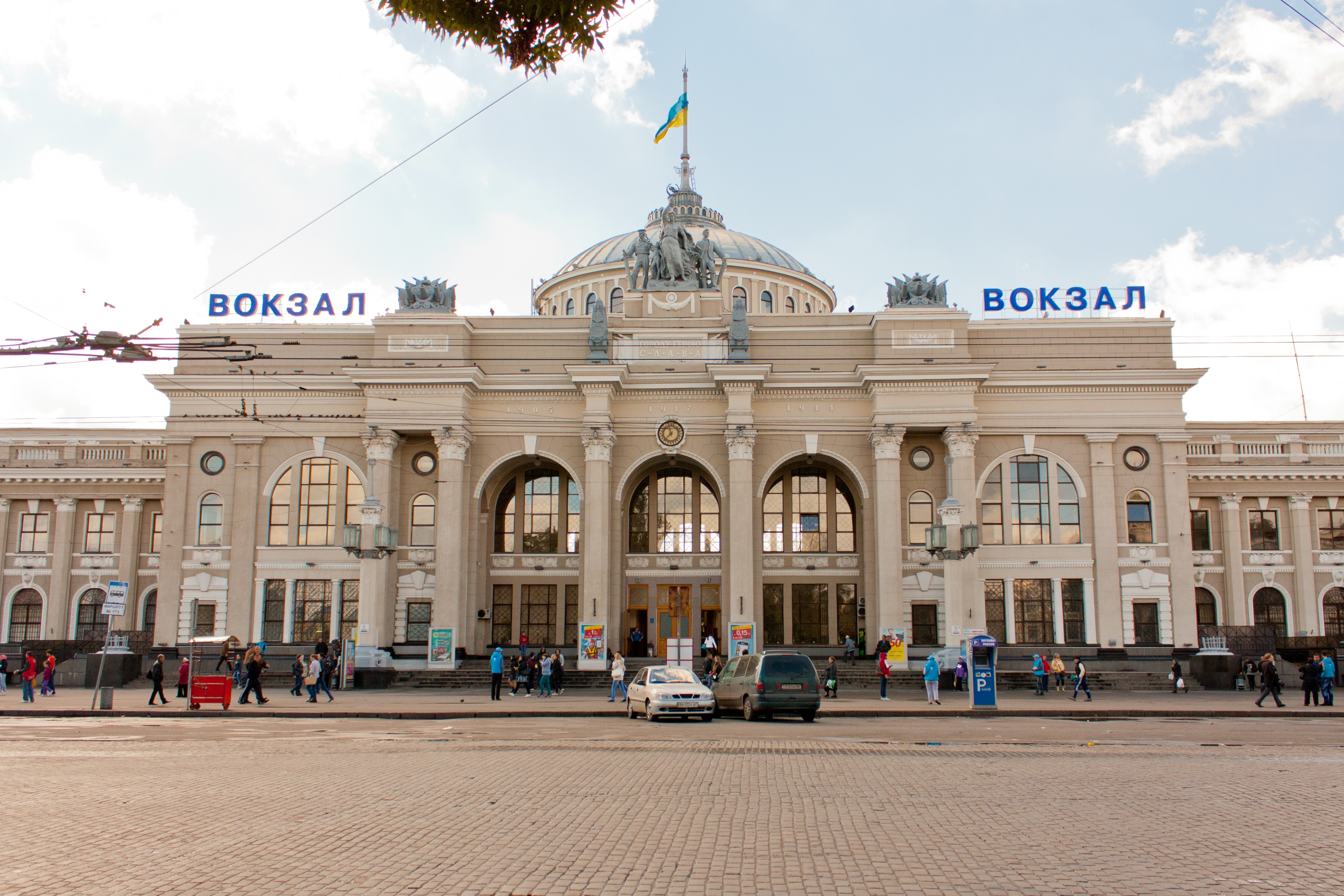
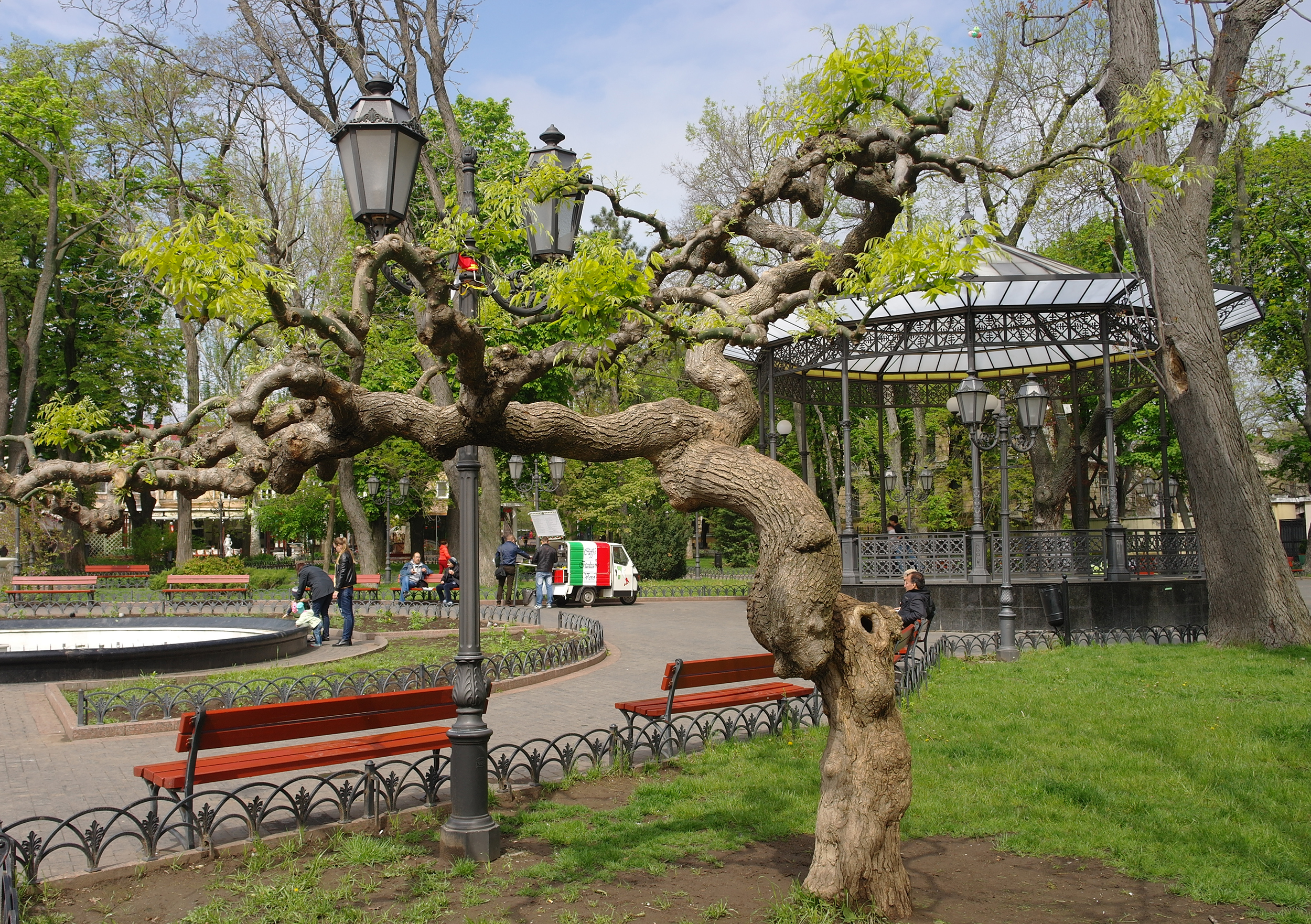
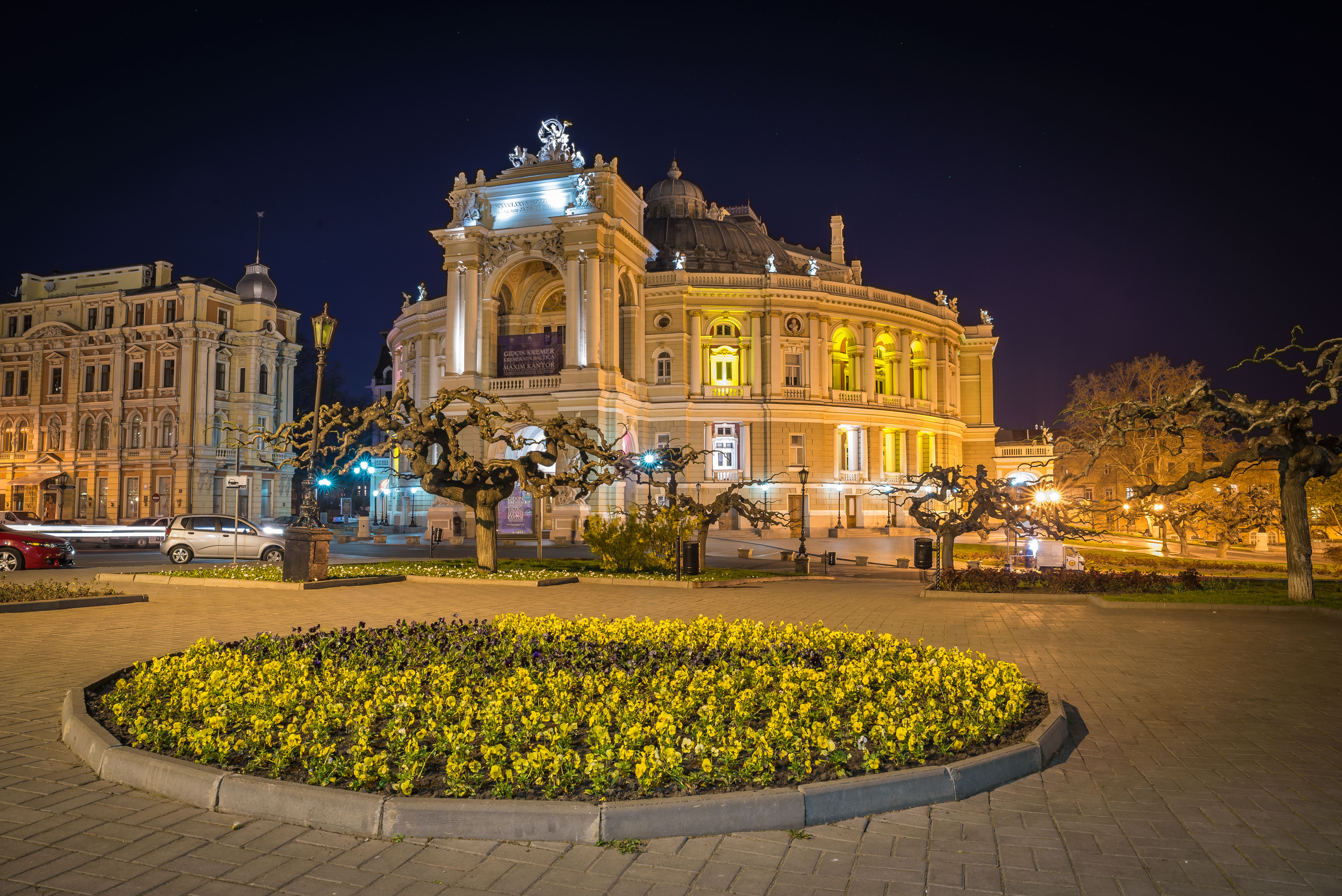
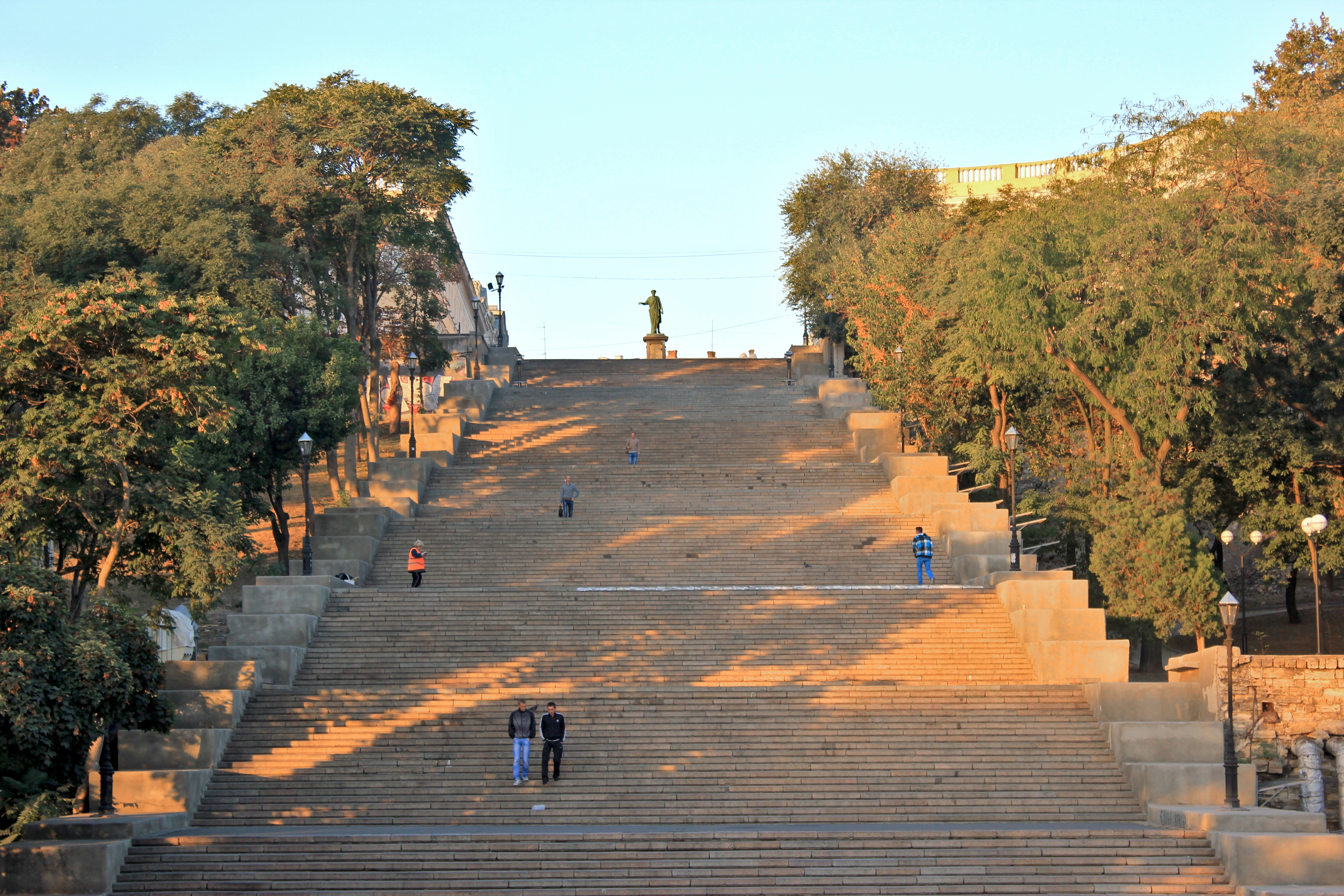
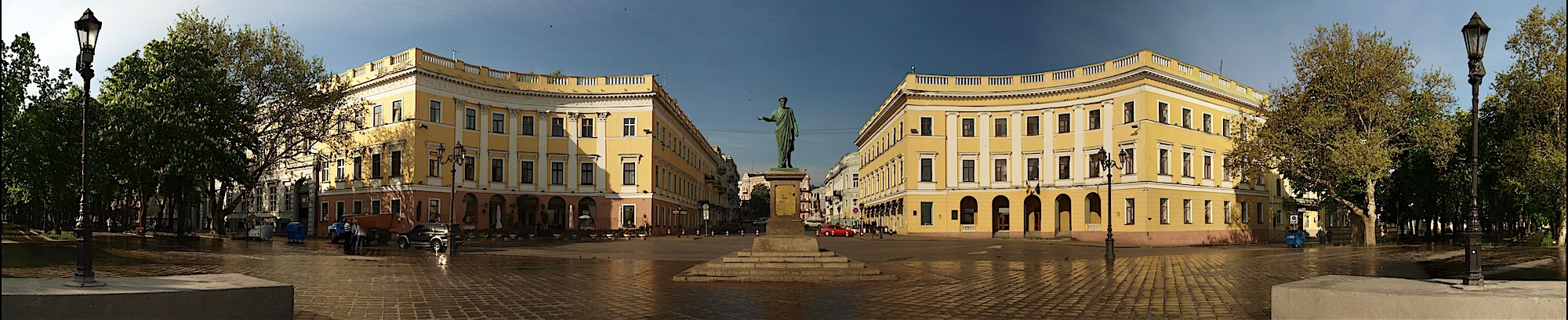
- Vorontsov Lighthouse Odesa-Holovna railway station Odesa City Garden Odesa Opera and Ballet Theatre Potemkin Stairs Square de Richelieu and Monument to the Duc de Richelieu

- Flag Coat of arms Logo
- Nicknames: Pearl by the Sea, Southern Palmyra, Southern Capital, Odesa-mama
- Location in Odesa Oblast Odesa (Ukraine) Odesa (Europe)
- Coordinates: 46°29′3″N 30°43′57″E
- Country: Ukraine
- Oblast: Odesa Oblast
- Raion: Odesa Raion
- Hromada: Odesa urban hromada
- First mentioned: 19 May 1415

Government
  - Head of the Odesa city military administration: Serhiy Lysak

Area
  - City: 162.42 km^{2} (62.71 sq mi)
  - Metro: 3,656 km^{2} (1,412 sq mi)
- Elevation: 40 m (130 ft)
- Highest elevation: 65 m (213 ft)
- Lowest elevation: −4.2 m (−14 ft)

Population (2022)
  - City: 1,010,537
  - Rank: 3rd in Ukraine
  - Density: 6,221.8/km^{2} (16,114/sq mi)
  - Metro: 1,378,490
- Demonym(s): English: Odesan, Odesite, Odessan, Odessite; Ukrainian: одесит, одеситка Russian: одессит, одесситка

GDP (nominal, 2020)
  - City: US$10.712 billion
  - Per capita: US$10,600
- Time zone: UTC+2 (EET)
  - Summer (DST): UTC+3 (EEST)
- Postal codes: 65000–65480
- Area code: +380 48
- Website: omr.gov.ua

UNESCO World Heritage Site
- Official name: The Historic Centre of Odesa
- Type: Cultural
- Criteria: ii, iv
- Designated: 2023 (18th extraordinary World Heritage Committee session)
- Reference no.: 1703
- UNESCO region: Europe
- Endangered: 2023–present

Odesa, (Note: Ukrainian: Одеса, pronounced [oˈdɛsɐ].) also spelled Odessa, (Note: Russian: Одесса, pronounced [ɐˈdʲes(ː)ɐ, ɐˈdɛs(ː)ə]. Many media outlets switched to prefer the Ukrainian transliteration "Odesa" over the Russian "Odessa" following Russia's invasion of Ukraine in 2022. See § Name.) is the third-most populous city and municipality in Ukraine and a major seaport and transport hub located in the south-west of the country, on the northwestern shore of the Black Sea. The city is also the administrative centre of the Odesa Raion and Odesa Oblast, as well as a multiethnic cultural centre. As of January 2021, Odesa's population was approximately 1,010,537. On 25 January 2023, its historic city centre was declared a World Heritage Site and added to the List of World Heritage in Danger by the UNESCO World Heritage Committee in recognition of its multiculturality and 19th-century urban planning. The declaration was made in response to the bombing of Odesa during the Russian invasion of Ukraine, which has damaged or destroyed buildings across the city.

In classical antiquity a large Greek settlement existed no later than the middle of the 6th century BC. It has been researched as a possible site of the ancient Greek settlement of Histria. The first chronicle mention of the Slavic settlement-port of Kotsiubijiv, which was part of the Grand Duchy of Lithuania, dates back to 1415, when a ship was sent from here to Constantinople by sea. After the Grand Duchy lost control, the port and its surroundings became part of the domain of the Ottoman Empire in 1529, under the name Hacibey, and remained in the empire until the Ottomans' defeat in the Russo-Turkish War in 1792. In 1794, a decree of the Russian empress Catherine II was issued to establish a navy harbor and trading place in Khadjibey, which was renamed Odessa soon after. From 1819 to 1858, Odesa was a free port. During the Soviet period, it was an important trading port and a naval base. During the 19th century, Odesa was the fourth largest city of the Russian Empire, after Moscow, Saint Petersburg and Warsaw. Its historical architecture is more Mediterranean than Russian, having been heavily influenced by French and Italian styles. Some buildings were built in a mixture of styles, including Art Nouveau, Renaissance and Classicist.

Odesa is a warm-water port. The city of Odesa hosts both the Port of Odesa and Port Pivdennyi, a significant oil terminal situated in the city's suburbs. Another notable port, Chornomorsk, is located in the same oblast, to the south-west of Odesa. Together they represent a major transport hub integrating with railways. Odesa's oil and chemical processing facilities are connected to the Russian and other European networks by strategic pipelines. In 2000, the Quarantine Pier at Odesa Commercial Sea Port was declared a free port and free economic zone for a period of 25 years.

== Name ==
- English: Odesa or Odessa /oʊˈdɛsə/ oh-DESS-ə
- Ukrainian: Одеса, romanized: Odesa [oˈdɛsɐ]
- Russian: Одесса, romanized: Odessa [ɐˈdʲes(ː)ə, ɐˈdɛs(ː)ə]
- Greek: Οδησσός, romanized: Odissós
- Yiddish: אָדעס, romanized: Odes
- Romanian: Odesa

Odesa is sometimes called the Pearl by the Sea, the Southern Capital, or Southern Palmyra, as well as Odesa-mama.

In 1795 the city was named Odessa in accordance with the Greek Plan of Empress Catherine II. Catherine's Secretary of State Adrian Gribovsky claimed in his memoirs that the name was his suggestion. Some expressed doubts about this claim, while others noted the reputation of Gribovsky as an honest and modest man. Odesa is located between the ancient Greek cities of Tyras and Olbia and it was named using a Slavic feminine form for the ancient Greek city of Odessos (Ancient Greek: Ὀδησσός; in Roman times, Odessus). This refers to the second ancient Odessos, founded between the end of the 5th and beginning of the 4th centuries BC (the first one, identified with modern Varna in Bulgaria, is the older of the two, founded c. 610 BC). The exact location of this ancient Odessos is unknown, but modern efforts have attempted to localize it 40 km northeast of Odesa, near the village of Koshary, Odesa Oblast., near the Tylihul Estuary.

Odessa, the transliteration of the name from Russian, was the traditional English spelling of the city's name favoured before Ukraine's independence in 1991 (similar to the spelling of Kiev versus Kyiv). It remained the predominant spelling until the mid-2010s, when international usage began to adopt the official transliteration Odesa as endorsed by the Ukrainian government.

Odesa became the internationally standardized Latin-alphabet transliteration of the Ukrainian name according to the Ukrainian National romanization system, which was adopted for official use by Ukraine's cabinet in 2010, approved by the UN Group of Experts on Geographical Names in 2012, and adopted by the BGN/PCGN in 2019. This spelling appears in Encyclopædia Britannica and in dictionaries as the spelling for the Ukrainian city. The spelling Odesa has also been adopted as the Library of Congress Name Authority Heading. As noted by the Christian Science Monitor, many in the English-language media outlets historically spelled the city Odessa, even after changing the spelling of Kiev to Kyiv, but since the beginning of Russia's 2022 invasion of Ukraine more outlets and style guides have been shifting away from Russian transliterations.

== History ==
Timeline of Odesa

Grand Duchy of Lithuania 1415–84
Ottoman Empire 1484–1789
Russian Empire 1789–1917

1917–1922 Revolution

Russian Provisional Government 1917
UPR Dec 1917–Jan 1918
OSR Jan–March 1918
Ukrainian State March–Dec 1918
AFSR Dec 1918–April 1919
PWPGU/ UkSSR April–Aug 1919
AFSR Aug 1919–Feb 1920
// UkSSR Feb 1920–Dec 1922

USSR 1922–41
Kingdom of Romania (occupation) 1941–44
USSR 1944–91
Ukraine 1991–present

=== Early history ===
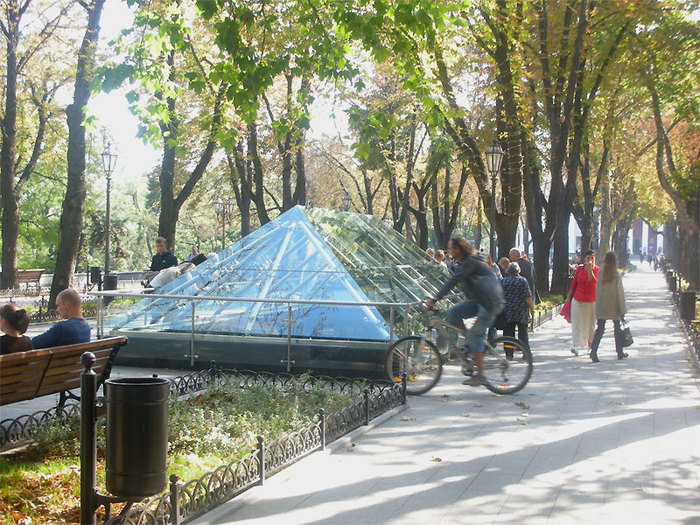
The remains of an ancient Greek settlement (under the glass roof) on Prymorskyi Boulevard in Odesa

Odesa was the site of a large Greek settlement no later than the middle of the 6th century BC (a necropolis from the 5th–3rd centuries BC has long been known in this area). Some scholars believe it to have been a trade settlement established by the Greek city of Histria. Whether the Bay of Odesa is the ancient "Port of the Histrians" cannot yet be considered a settled question based on the available evidence. Archaeological artifacts confirm extensive links between the Odesa area and the eastern Mediterranean.

In the Middle Ages successive rulers of the Odesa region included various nomadic tribes (Petchenegs, Cumans), the Golden Horde, the Crimean Khanate, the Grand Duchy of Lithuania, and the Ottoman Empire. Yedisan Crimean Tatars traded there in the 14th century.

Since the middle of the 13th century the city's territory belonged to the Golden Horde domain. On Italian navigational maps of 14th century on the place of Odesa is indicated the castle of Ginestra, at the time the center of a Gazarian colony of the Republic of Genoa. During the reign of Khan Hacı I Giray of Crimea (1441–1466), the Khanate was endangered by the Golden Horde and the Ottoman Turks and, in search of allies, the khan agreed to cede the area to Lithuania. The site of present-day Odesa was then a fortress known as Khadjibey (named for Hacı I Giray, and also spelled Kocibey in English, Hacıbey or Hocabey in Turkish, and Hacıbey in Crimean Tatar). Khadjibey was first mentioned in 1415 in Polish chronicles by Jan Długosz, when a ship with grain sailed from there to Constantinople. By the middle of the 15th century, the settlement was depopulated.

=== Ottoman conquest ===
Khadjibey came under direct control of the Ottoman Empire after 1529. In the mid-18th century, the Ottomans rebuilt the fortress at Khadjibey (also known as Hocabey), which was named Yeni Dünya (literally "New World").

=== Russian conquest of Sanjak of Özi (Ochakiv Oblast) ===
A series of wars between the Russian Empire and the Ottoman Empire, as well as the demise of the Polish–Lithuanian Commonwealth, allowed Russia to start to fully exploit the ancient Black Sea trade across the coastal area through the steppe across southern and eastern Ukraine, into the hinterland of East Central Europe. Stable commercial activity in this region in practice in the past required both security through the overland routes, and knowledge of where products could go overseas. In antiquity, various Greek colonies had taken this role, followed by the Varangians who established Kievan Rus' in the 9th century, as well as various Italian colonies after the Mongol invasion of Europe. Under Catherine the Great, Russia gained, via the Treaty of Küçük Kaynarca, the lands where Mariupol, Kherson, and Mykolaiv would be founded. However, they were all handicapped in various ways relative to how much commercial interest there was. For example, the latter two cities were situated in lowlands near marshes, which provided for poor sanitary conditions in the technology available at that time.

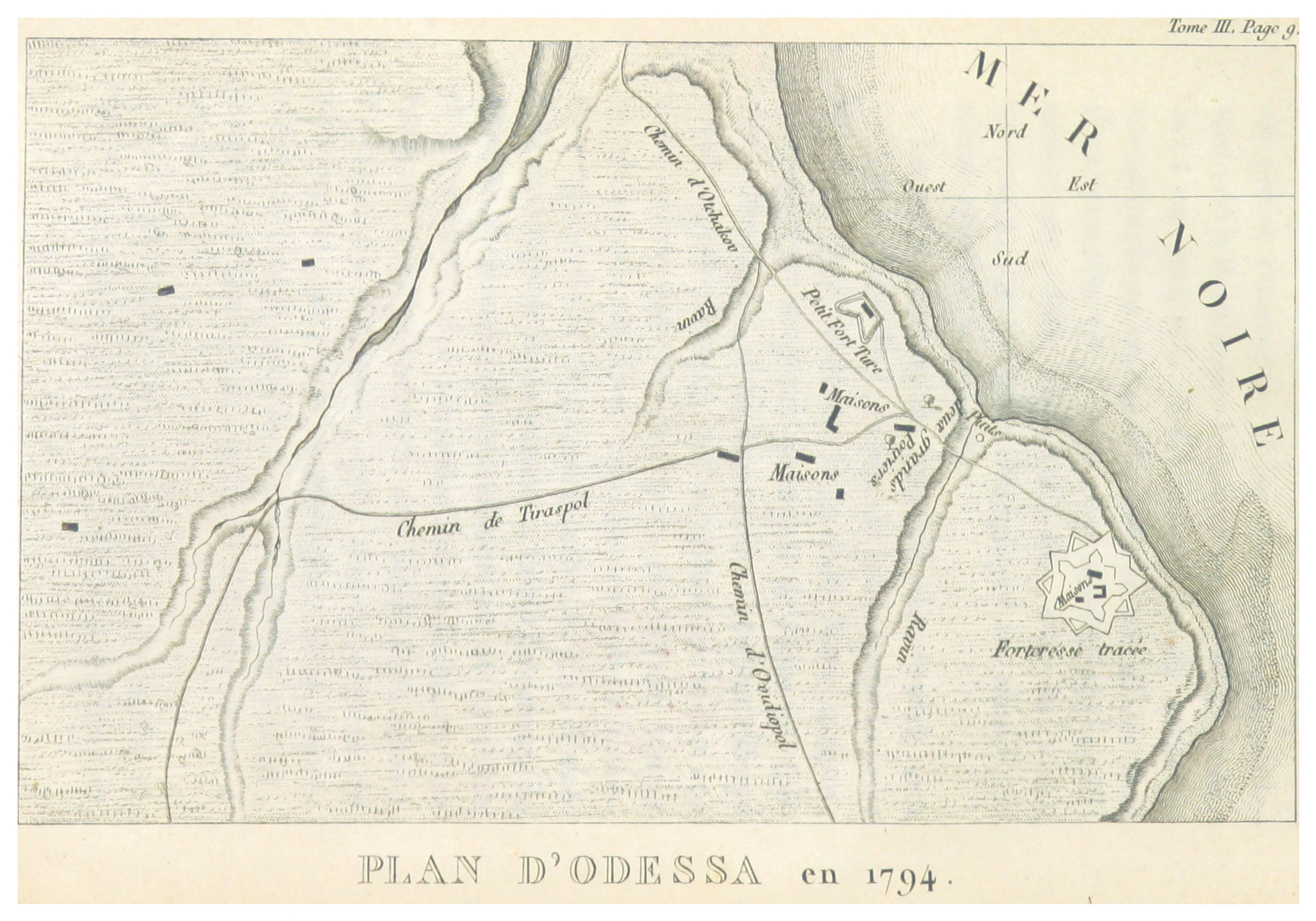
A map of Odesa in 1794

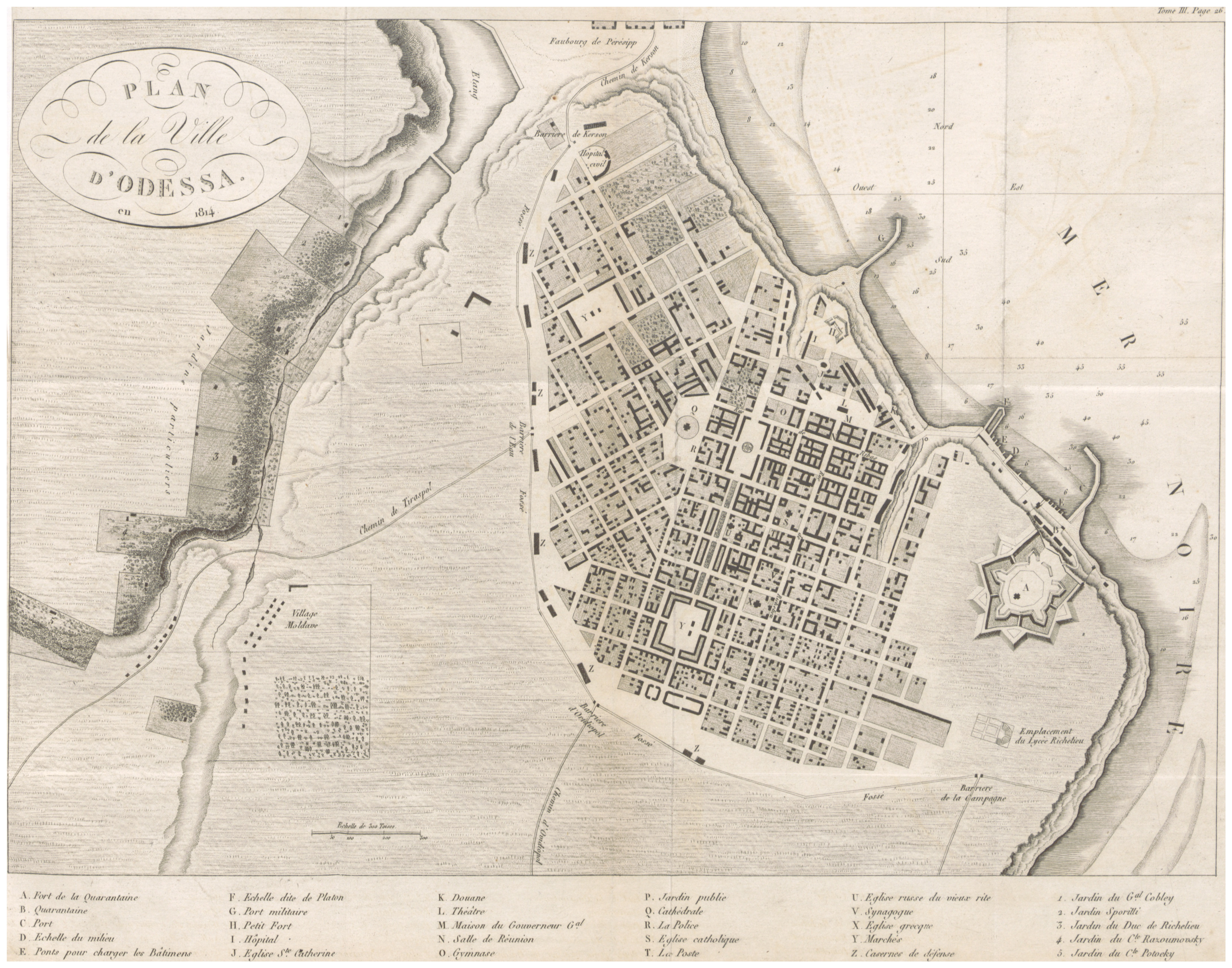
A map of Odesa in 1814

The sleepy fishing village of Odesa had witnessed a sea-change in its fortunes when the wealthy magnate and future Voivode of Kiev (1791), Antoni Protazy Potocki, established trade routes through the port for the Polish Black Sea Trading Company and set up the infrastructure in the 1780s.

During the Russian-Turkish War of 1787–1792, on 25 September 1789, a detachment of Russian forces, including Zaporozhian Cossacks under Alexander Suvorov and Ivan Gudovich, took Khadjibey and Yeni Dünya for the Russian Empire. One section of the troops came under command of a Spaniard in Russian service: Major General José de Ribas (known in Russia as Osip Mikhailovich Deribas); today, the main street in Odesa, Deribasivska Street, is named after him.

Russia formally gained possession of the Sanjak of Özi (Ochakiv Oblast) as a result of the Treaty of Jassy (Iaşi) in 1792 and it became a part of Yekaterinoslav Viceroyalty. The Russian Empire took full control of Crimea, as well as land between the Southern Bug and the Dniester, including the Khadzhibey Estuary where the Turkish fortress of Khadjibey was located. The newly acquired Ochakov Oblast was promised to the Cossacks by the Russian government for resettlement. On permission of the Archbishop of Yekaterinoslav Amvrosiy, the Black Sea Kosh Host, that was located around the area between Bender and Ochakiv, built a second wooden church of Saint Nicholas, after the one in Sucleia.

By the Highest rescript of 17 June 1792 addressed to General Kakhovsky it was ordered to establish the Dniester Border Line of fortresses. The commander of the land forces in Ochakiv Oblast was appointed Graf (Count) Suvorov-Rymnikskiy. The main fortress was built near Sucleia at the mouth of river Botna as the Head Dniester Fortress by Engineer-Major de Wollant. Near the new fortress saw the formation of a new "Vorstadt" (suburb) where people moved from Sucleia and Parkan. With the establishment of the Voznesensk Governorate on 27 January 1795, the Vorstadt was named Tiraspol.

The Flemish engineer working for the Russian Empress Catherine the Great, José de Ribas's collaborator Franz de Voland recommended the area of Khadjibey fortress as the site for the region's basic port: it had an ice-free harbor, breakwaters could be cheaply constructed that would render the harbor safe and it would have the capacity to accommodate large fleets. The Namestnik of Yekaterinoslav and Voznesensk, Platon Zubov (one of Catherine's favorites), supported this proposal. In 1794 Catherine issued a Rescript to José de Ribas: "Considering favorable Khadjibey location... I order to establish here a navy harbor and trading pierce..." and invested the first money (26.000 rubles) in construction. Franz de Voland drew up a plan that would end up being the city's plan.

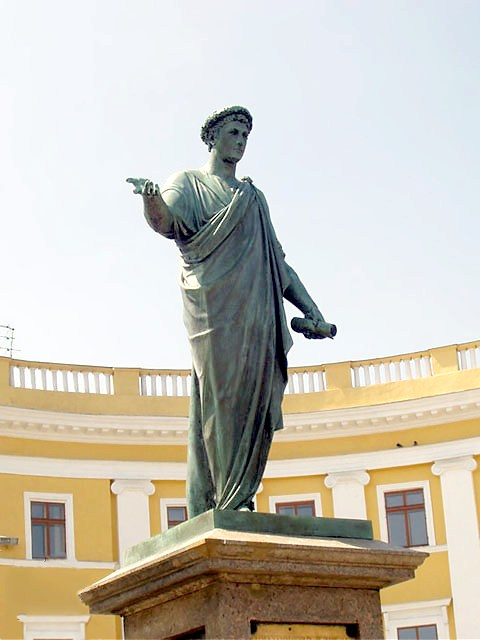
Ivan Martos's statue of the Duc de Richelieu in Odesa

However, adjacent to the new official locality, a Moldavian colony already existed, which by the end of the 18th century was an independent settlement named Moldavanka. Some local historians consider that the settlement predates Odesa by about thirty years and assert that the locality was founded by Moldavians who came to build the fortress of Yeni Dunia for the Ottomans and eventually settled in the area in the late 1760s, right next to the settlement of Khadjibey, on what later became the Primorsky Boulevard. Another version posits that the settlement appeared after Odesa itself was founded, as a settlement of Moldavians, Greeks, and Albanians fleeing the Ottoman yoke.

Under Paul I of Russia, construction of Odesa was stopped, Franz de Voland was removed from the project, and José de Ribas was implicated in a plot to assassinate the Emperor. After Paul's assassination in 1801, the city resumed construction, and used a plan largely from de Voland's work. It was thus one of the few master planned cities in the Russian Empire.

=== Renaming of the settlement and establishment of sea port ===
In 1795, Khadjibey was officially renamed with the feminine name "Одесса (Odessa)" after a Greek colony of Odessos that supposedly was located in the area. The first census that was conducted in Odesa was in 1797 which accounted for 3,455 people. Since 1795, the city had its own city magistrate, and since 1796 a city council of six members and the Odesa Commodity Exchange. In 1801, in Odesa had opened the first commercial bank. In 1803, the city accounted for 9,000 people.

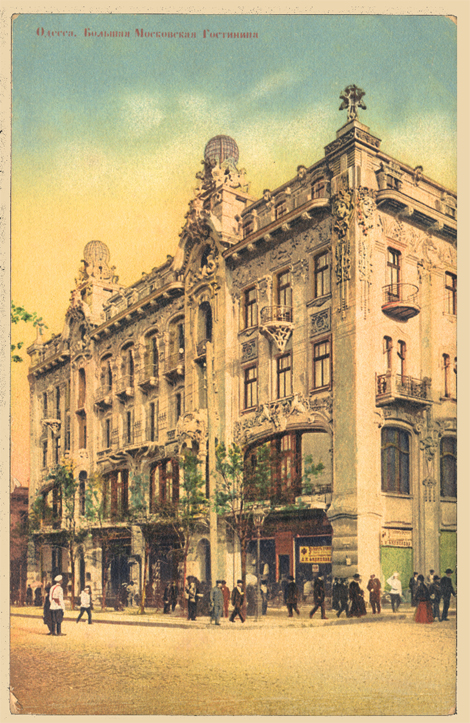
In the mid-19th century, Odesa became a resort town famed for its popularity among the Russian upper classes. This popularity prompted a new age of investment in the building of hotels and leisure projects.

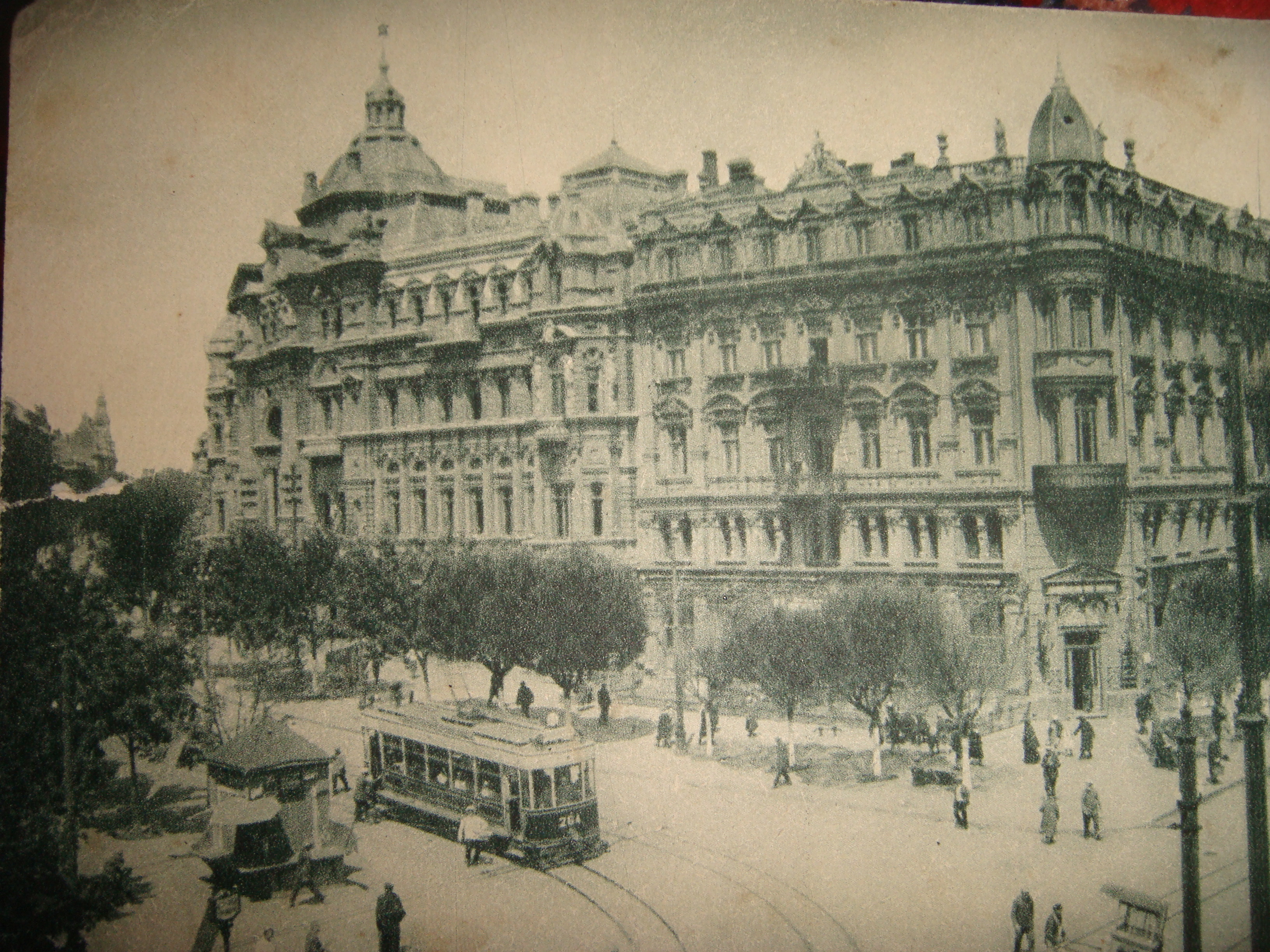
By the early 1900s Odesa had become a large, thriving city, complete with European architecture and electrified urban transport.

In their settlement, also known as Novaya Slobodka, the Moldavians owned relatively small plots on which they built village-style houses and cultivated vineyards and gardens. What became Mykhailovsky Square was the center of this settlement and the site of its first Orthodox church, the Church of the Dormition, built in 1821 close to the seashore, as well as a cemetery. Nearby stood the military barracks and the country houses (dacha) of the city's wealthy residents, including that of the Duc de Richelieu, appointed by Tsar Alexander I as Governor of Odesa in 1803. Richelieu played a role during Ottoman plague epidemic which hit Odesa in the autumn 1812. Dismissive of any attempt to forge a compromise between quarantine requirements and free trade, Prince Kurakin (the Saint Petersburg-based High Commissioner for Sanitation) countermanded Richelieu's orders.

In the period from 1795 to 1814, the population of Odesa increased 15 times over and reached almost 20 thousand people. The first city plan was designed by the engineer F. Devollan in the late 18th century. Colonists of various ethnicities settled mainly in the area of the former colony, outside of the official boundaries, and as a consequence, in the first third of the 19th century, Moldavanka emerged as the dominant settlement. After planning by the official architects who designed buildings in Odesa's central district, such as the Italians Francesco Carlo Boffo and Giovanni Torricelli (see Italians of Odesa), Moldovanka was included in the general city plan, though the original grid-like plan of Moldovankan streets, lanes, and squares remained unchanged.

The new city quickly became a major success although initially, it received little state funding and privileges. Its early growth owed much to the work of the Duc de Richelieu, who served as the city's governor between 1803 and 1814. Having fled the French Revolution, he had served in Catherine's army against the Turks. He is credited with designing the city and organizing its amenities and infrastructure, and is considered one of the founding fathers of Odesa, together with another Frenchman, Count Andrault de Langeron, who succeeded him in office.

Richelieu is commemorated by a bronze statue, unveiled in 1828 to a design by Ivan Martos. His contributions to the city are mentioned by Mark Twain in his travelogue Innocents Abroad: "I mention this statue and this stairway because they have their story. Richelieu founded Odessa – watched over it with paternal care – labored with a fertile brain and a wise understanding for its best interests – spent his fortune freely to the same end – endowed it with a sound prosperity, and one which will yet make it one of the great cities of the Old World".

In 1819, Odesa became a free port, a status it retained until 1859. Odesa became home to an extremely diverse population of Albanians, Armenians, Azeris, Bulgarians, Crimean Tatars, Frenchmen, Germans (including Mennonites), Greeks, Italians, Jews, Poles, Romanians, Russians, Turks, Ukrainians, and traders representing many other nationalities (hence numerous "ethnic" names on the city's map, for example Frantsuzky (French) and Italiansky (Italian) Boulevards, Grecheskaya (Greek), Yevreyskaya (Jewish), Arnautskaya (Albanian) Streets).

The Filiki Eteria, a Greek freemasonry-style society that was to play an important role in the Greek War of Independence, was founded in Odesa in 1814 before relocating to Constantinople in 1818. Hundreds of refugees from the Chios massacre settled in Odesa. Odesa's cosmopolitan nature was documented by the great Russian poet Alexander Pushkin, who lived in internal exile in Odesa between 1823 and 1824. In his letters, he wrote that Odesa was a city where "the air is filled with all Europe, French is spoken and there are European papers and magazines to read".

Odesa's growth was interrupted by the Crimean War of 1853–1856, during which it was bombarded by British and Imperial French naval forces. It soon recovered and the growth in trade made Odesa Russia's largest grain-exporting port. In 1866, the city was linked by rail with Kyiv and Kharkiv as well as with Iaşi in Romania.

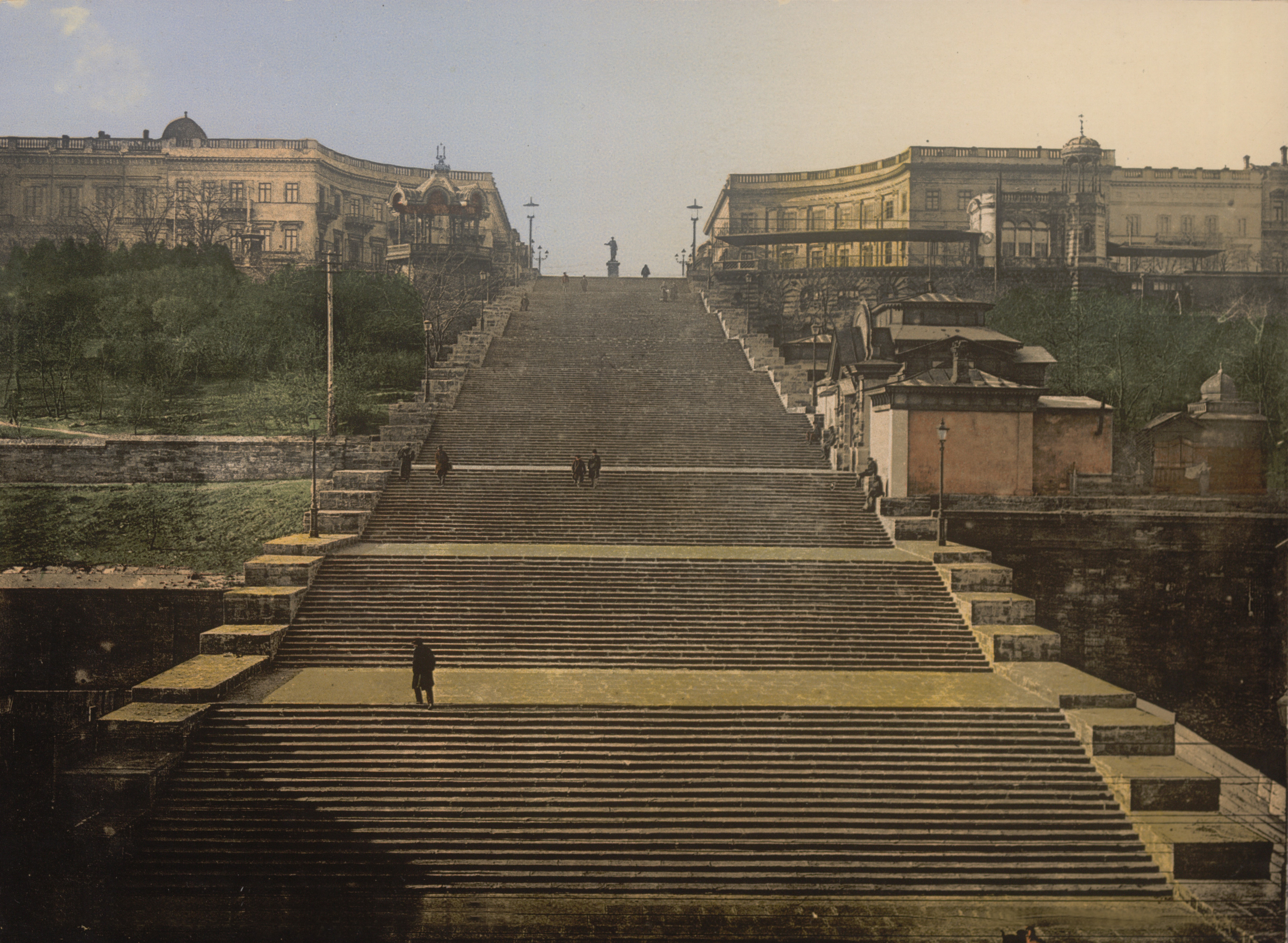
The 142-metre-long (466 ft) Potemkin Stairs (constructed 1837–1841), which were famously featured in the 1925 film Battleship Potemkin. It was built with the important contribution of the Italians of Odesa.

The city became the home of a large Jewish community during the 19th century, and by 1897 Jews were estimated to comprise some 37% of the population. The community, however, was repeatedly subjected to antisemitism and anti-Jewish agitation from almost all Christian segments of the population. Pogroms were carried out in 1821, 1859, 1871, 1881 and 1905. Many Odesan Jews fled abroad after 1882, particularly to the Ottoman region that became Palestine, and the city became an important base of support for Zionism.

Until the 1870s, Odesa's Italian population grew steadily. From the following decade this growth stopped, and the decline of the Italian community in Odesa began. The reason was mainly one, namely the gradual integration into the Slavic population of Odesa, i.e. Russians and Ukrainians. Surnames began to be Russianized and Ukrainianized. The revolution of 1917 sent many of them to Italy, or to other cities in Europe. In Soviet times, only a few dozen Italians remained in Odesa, most of whom no longer knew their own language. Over time they merged with the local population, losing the ethnic connotations of origin. They disappeared completely by World War II.

=== Beginnings of revolution ===
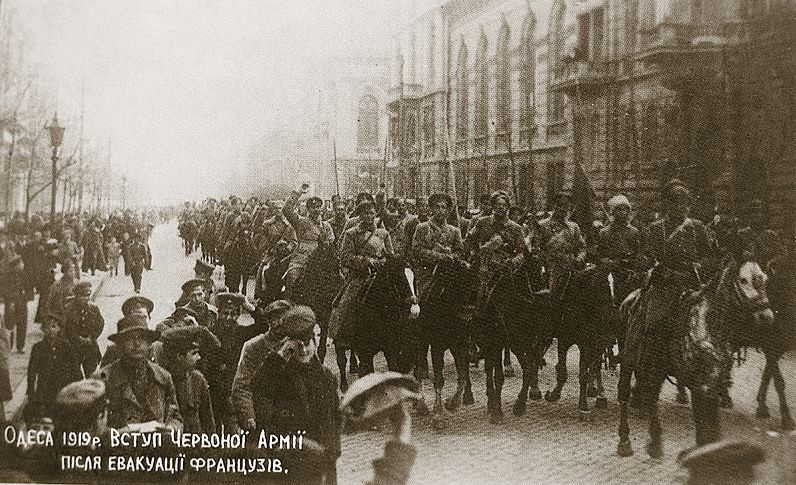
Bolshevik troops entering Odesa

In 1905, Odesa was the site of a workers' uprising supported by the crew of the Russian battleship Potemkin and the Menshevik's Iskra. Sergei Eisenstein's famous motion picture The Battleship Potemkin commemorated the uprising and included a scene where hundreds of Odesan citizens were murdered on the great stone staircase (now popularly known as the "Potemkin Steps"), in one of the most famous scenes in motion picture history. At the top of the steps, which lead down to the port, stands a statue of the Duc de Richelieu.

The actual massacre took place in streets nearby, not on the steps themselves, but the film caused many to visit Odesa to see the site of the "slaughter". The "Odesa Steps" continue to be a tourist attraction in Odesa. The film was made at Odesa's Cinema Factory, one of the oldest cinema studios in the former Soviet Union.

Following the Bolshevik Revolution in 1917 during Ukrainian-Soviet War, Odesa saw two Bolshevik armed insurgencies, the second of which succeeded in establishing their control over the city; for the following months, the city became a center of the Odesa Soviet Republic. After signing of the Brest-Litovsk Treaty all Bolshevik forces were driven out by 13 March 1918 by the combined armed forces of the Austro-Hungarian Army, providing support to the Ukrainian People's Republic.

With the end of the World War I and the withdrawal of armies of Central Powers, the Soviet forces fought for control over the country with the army of the Ukrainian People's Republic. A few months later the city was occupied by the French Army and the Greek Army that supported the Russian White Army in its struggle with the Bolsheviks. The Ukrainian general Nykyfor Hryhoriv who sided with Bolsheviks managed to drive the Triple Entente forces out of the city, but Odesa was soon retaken by the Russian White Army. By 1920 the Soviet Red Army managed to overpower both the Ukrainian and Russian White Army and secure the city.

The people of Odesa suffered badly from a famine that resulted from the Russian Civil War in 1921–1922 due to the Soviet policies of prodrazverstka. In 1937, around 1,000 Poles were executed in Odesa during the Polish Operation of the NKVD.

=== World War II ===
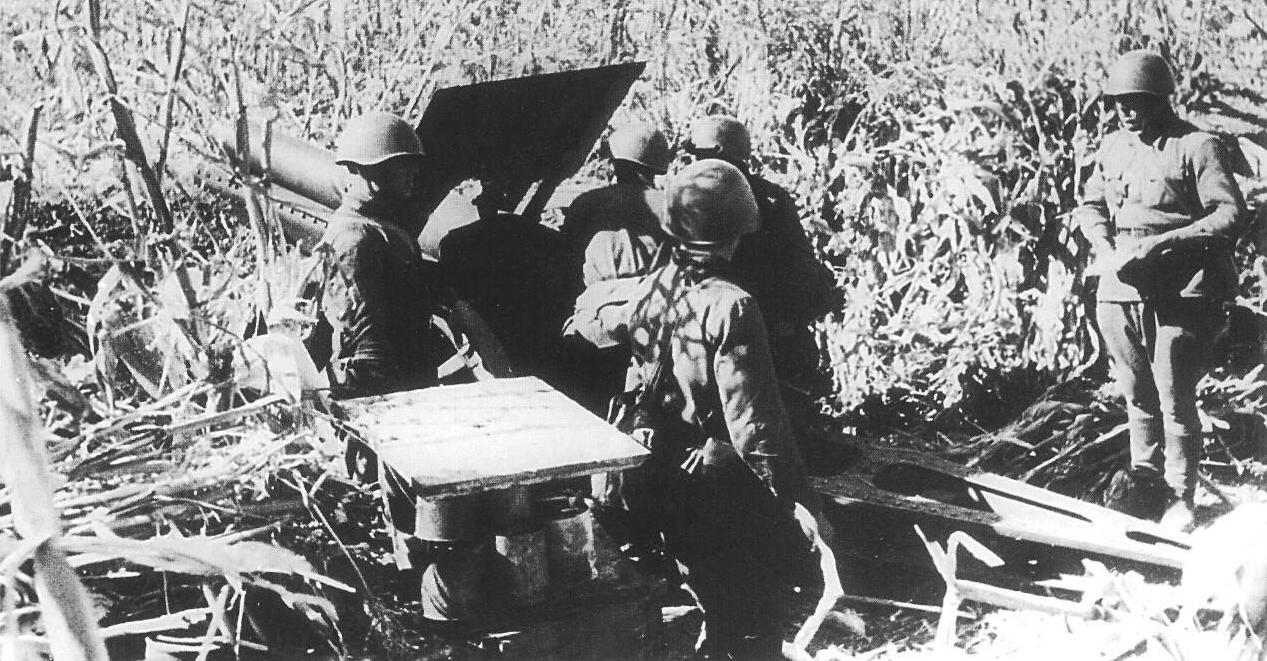
A Soviet gun crew in action at Odesa in 1941

During World War II, Odesa was attacked by Romanian and German troops in August 1941. The Siege of Odessa (1941) started on 5 August and lasted for 73 days. The defense was organized on three lines with emplacements consisting of trenches, anti-tank ditches and pillboxes. The first line was 80 km (50 mi) long and situated some 25 to 30 km (16 to 19 mi) from the city. The second and main line of defense was situated 6 to 8 km (3.7 to 5.0 mi) from the city and was about 30 km (19 mi) long. The third and last line of defense was organized inside the city itself. Lyudmila Pavlichenko, the famous female sniper, took part in the battle for Odesa. She recorded 187 confirmed kills during the defense of Odesa. Pavlichenko's confirmed kills during World War II totaled 309 (including 36 enemy snipers).

The city fell to the Axis on 16 October 1941, and it was henceforth subject to Romanian administration. By that time, the Soviet authorities had been able to evacuate 200,000 people as well as weaponry and industrial equipment. A day later, Odesa was made the capital of Transnistria. Partisan fighting continued, however, in the city's catacombs.

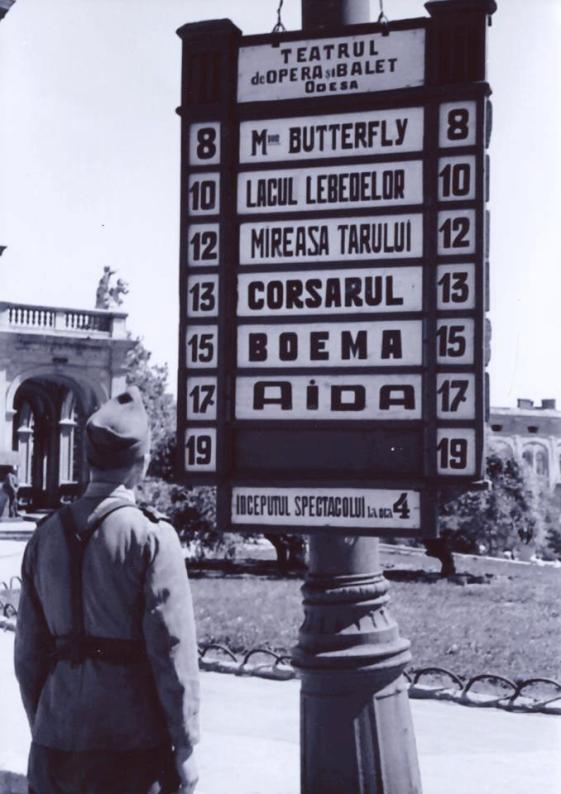
Soldier reading the announcement of the Opera House in Odesa during the Romanian occupation in 1942

Following the siege, and the Axis occupation, approximately 25,000 Odesans were murdered in the outskirts of the city and over 35,000 deported; this came to be known as the 1941 Odessa massacre. Most of the atrocities were committed during the first six months of the occupation which officially began on 17 October 1941, when 80 per cent of the 210,000 Jews in the region were killed, compared to Jews in Romania proper where the majority survived. After the Nazi forces began to lose ground on the Eastern Front, the Romanian administration changed its policy, refusing to deport the remaining Jewish population to extermination camps in German occupied Poland, and allowing Jews to work as hired labourers. As a result, despite the events of 1941, the survival of the Jewish population in this area was higher than in other areas of occupied eastern Europe.

A Soviet medal, "For the Defence of Odesa", was established on 22 December 1942. It was one of the first four Soviet cities to be awarded the title of "Hero City" in 1945. (The others were Leningrad, Stalingrad, and Sevastopol). The city suffered severe damage and sustained many casualties over the course of the war. Many parts of Odesa were damaged during both its siege and recapture on 10 April 1944, when the city was finally liberated by the Red Army. Some of the Odesans had a more favourable view of the Romanian occupation, in contrast with the Soviet official view that the period was exclusively a time of hardship, deprivation, oppression and suffering – claims embodied in public monuments and disseminated through the media to this day. Subsequent Soviet policies imprisoned and executed numerous Odesans (and deported most of the German population) on account of collaboration with the occupiers.

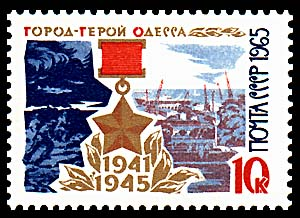
Postage stamp of the USSR 1965 "Hero-City Odesa 1941–1945"

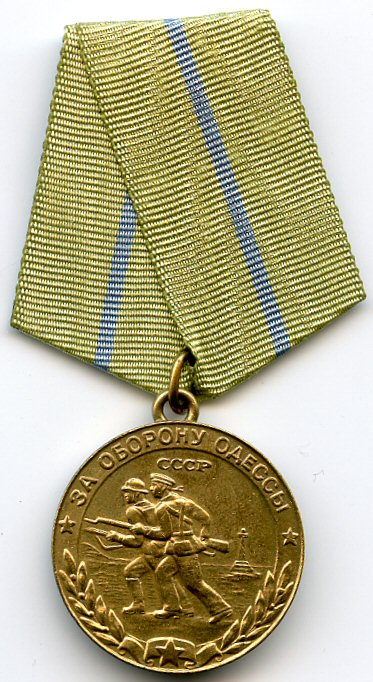
Obverse of the Soviet campaign medal "For the Defence of Odesa"

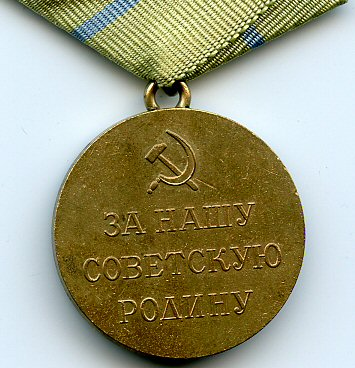
Reverse of the Soviet campaign medal "For the Defence of Odesa"; the inscription reads "For our Soviet homeland".

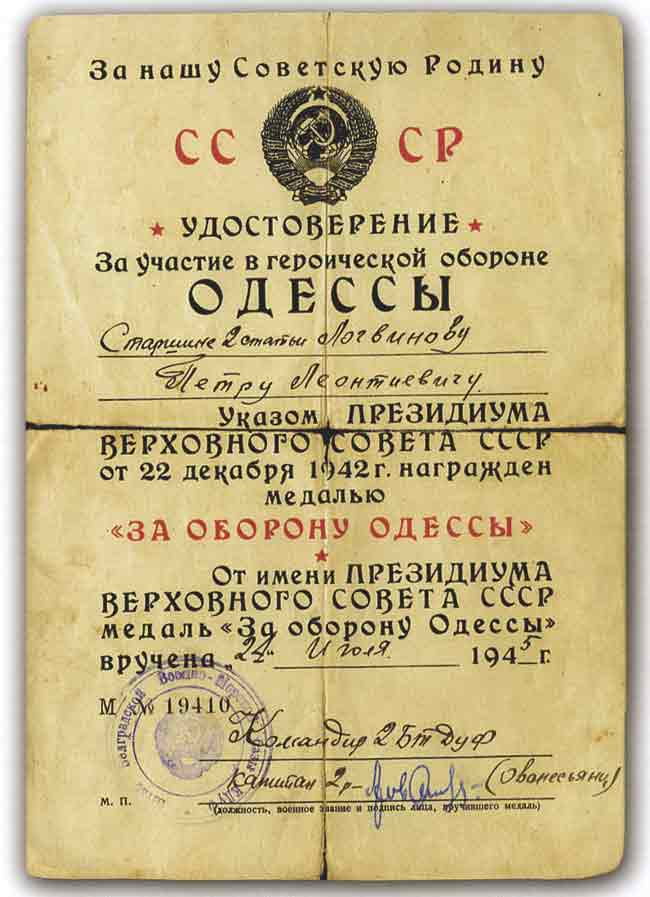
Certificate "For taking part in the heroic defense of Odesa"; Logvinov Petr Leontievich was awarded the Medal for the Defense of Odesa.

=== Postwar Soviet period ===
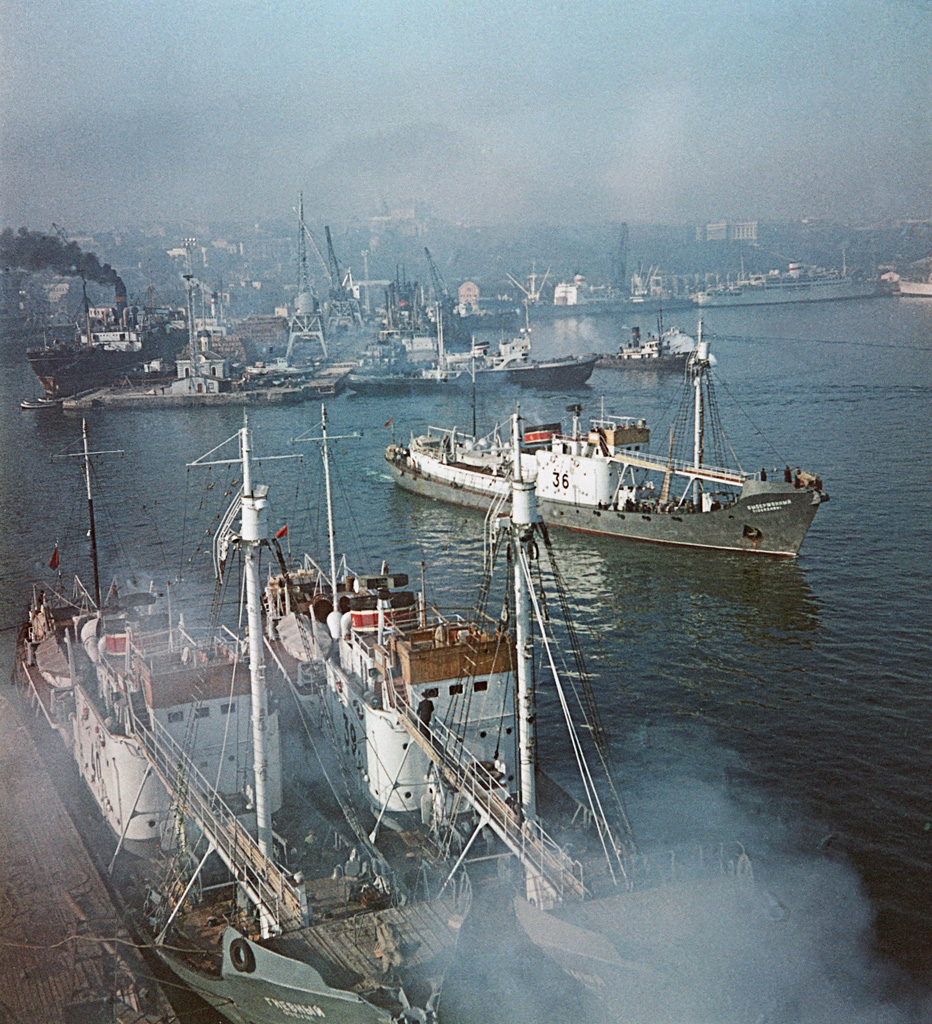
Ships at anchor in Odesa – the USSR's largest port, 1960

During the 1960s and 1970s, the city grew. Nevertheless, the majority of Odesa's Jews emigrated to Israel, the United States and other Western countries between the 1970s and 1990s. Many ended up in the Brooklyn neighborhood of Brighton Beach, sometimes known as "Little Odesa". Domestic migration of the Odesan middle and upper classes to Moscow and Leningrad, cities that offered even greater opportunities for career advancement, also occurred on a large scale. Despite this, the city grew rapidly by filling the void of those left with new migrants from rural Ukraine and industrial professionals invited from all over the Soviet Union.

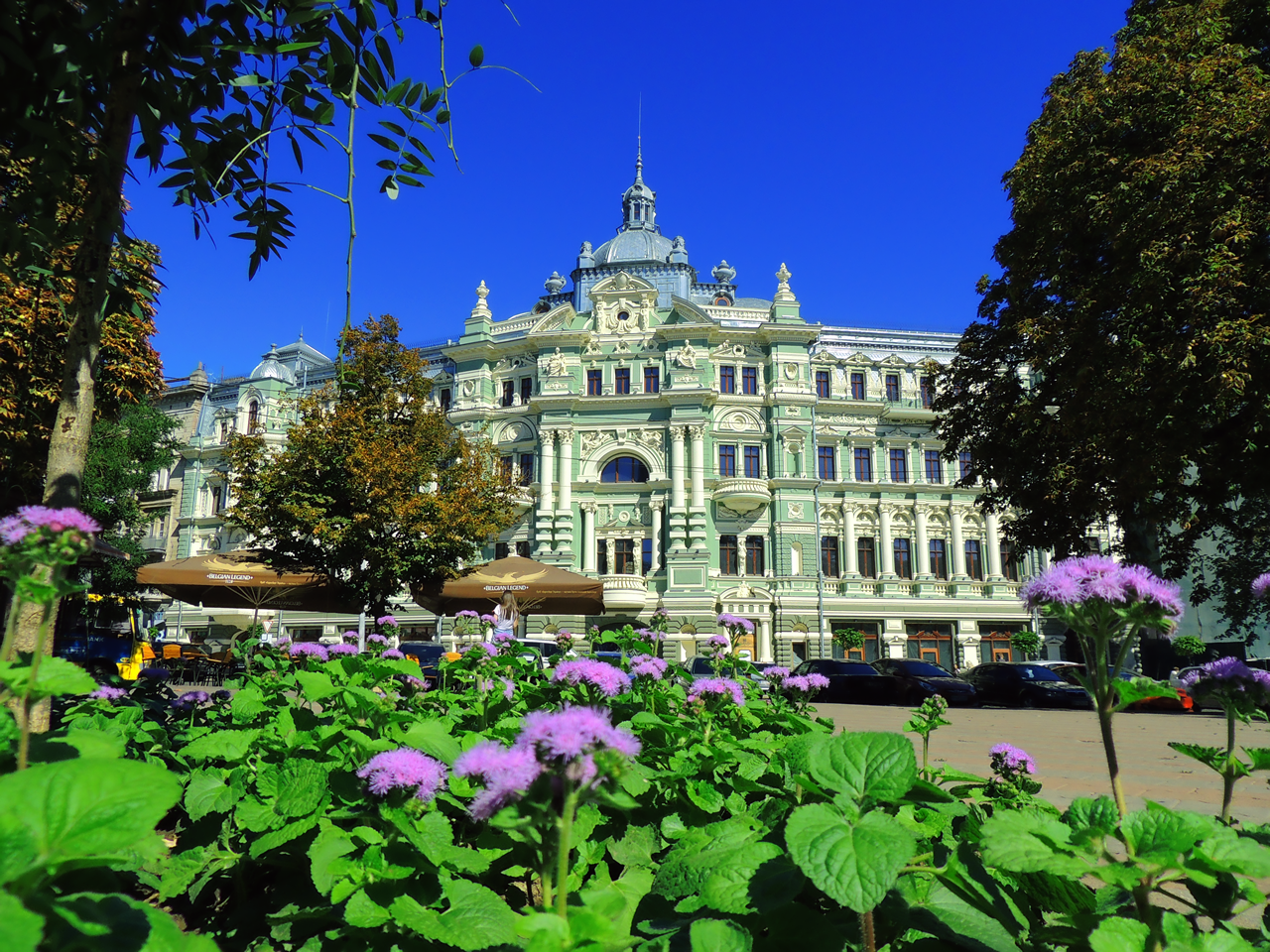
The city is currently undergoing a phase of widespread urban restoration: Russov House in 2020.

As a part of the Ukrainian Soviet Socialist Republic, the city preserved and somewhat reinforced its unique cosmopolitan mix of Russian/Ukrainian/Jewish culture and a predominantly Russophone environment with the uniquely accented dialect of Russian spoken in the city. The city's unique identity has been formed largely thanks to its varied demography; all the city's communities have influenced aspects of Odesan life in some way or form.

=== Independent Ukraine ===
In the 1991 Ukrainian independence referendum 85.38% of Odesa Oblast voted for independence.

Odesa is a city of more than 1 million people. The city's industries include shipbuilding, oil refining, chemicals, metalworking, and food processing. Odesa is also a Ukrainian naval base and home to a fishing fleet. It is known for its large outdoor market – the Seventh-Kilometer Market, the largest of its kind in Europe.

Odesa was a contender for hosting Euro 2012 football matches in, but lost the competition to other cities in Ukraine.

The city saw violence in the 2014 pro-Russian unrest in Ukraine during the 2014 Odesa clashes. The 2 May 2014 Odesa clashes between pro-Ukrainian and pro-Russian protestors killed 42 people. Four were killed during the protests, and at least 32 people were killed after a trade union building was set on fire after Molotov cocktails exchange between sides. Polls conducted from September to December 2014 found no support for joining Russia.

Odesa was struck by three bomb blasts in December 2014, one of which killed one person (the injuries sustained by the victim indicated that he had dealt with explosives). Internal Affairs Ministry advisor Zorian Shkiryak said on 25 December that Odesa and Kharkiv had become "cities which are being used to escalate tensions" in Ukraine. Shkiryak said that he suspected that these cities were singled out because of their "geographic position". On 5 January 2015 the city's Euromaidan Coordination Center and a cargo train car were (non-lethally) bombed.

Until 18 July 2020, Odesa was incorporated as a city of oblast significance. In July 2020, as part of the administrative reform of Ukraine, which reduced the number of raions of Odesa Oblast to seven, the city of Odesa was merged into newly established Odesa Raion.

In the 2022 Russian invasion of Ukraine, the city faced Russian bombing attacks. On 23 April 2022, Russian troops bombarded Odesa with cruise missiles. They destroyed both the city's military infrastructure and residential buildings, killing eight people and wounding another eighteen people. In addition, the Russian military destroyed more than 1,000 m^{2} of the territory of the cemetery. The city suffered further aerial attacks on regional infrastructure facilities in October 2022, cutting off power to 10,500 households and injuring three people. Throughout the war, Odesa came under repeated attack.

On 25 January 2023, UNESCO announced that the historical city center of Odesa was added to UNESCO's World Heritage List. In order to provide technical and financial assistance if needed, it was also included into the list of world heritage sites in danger.

== Geography ==
=== Location ===
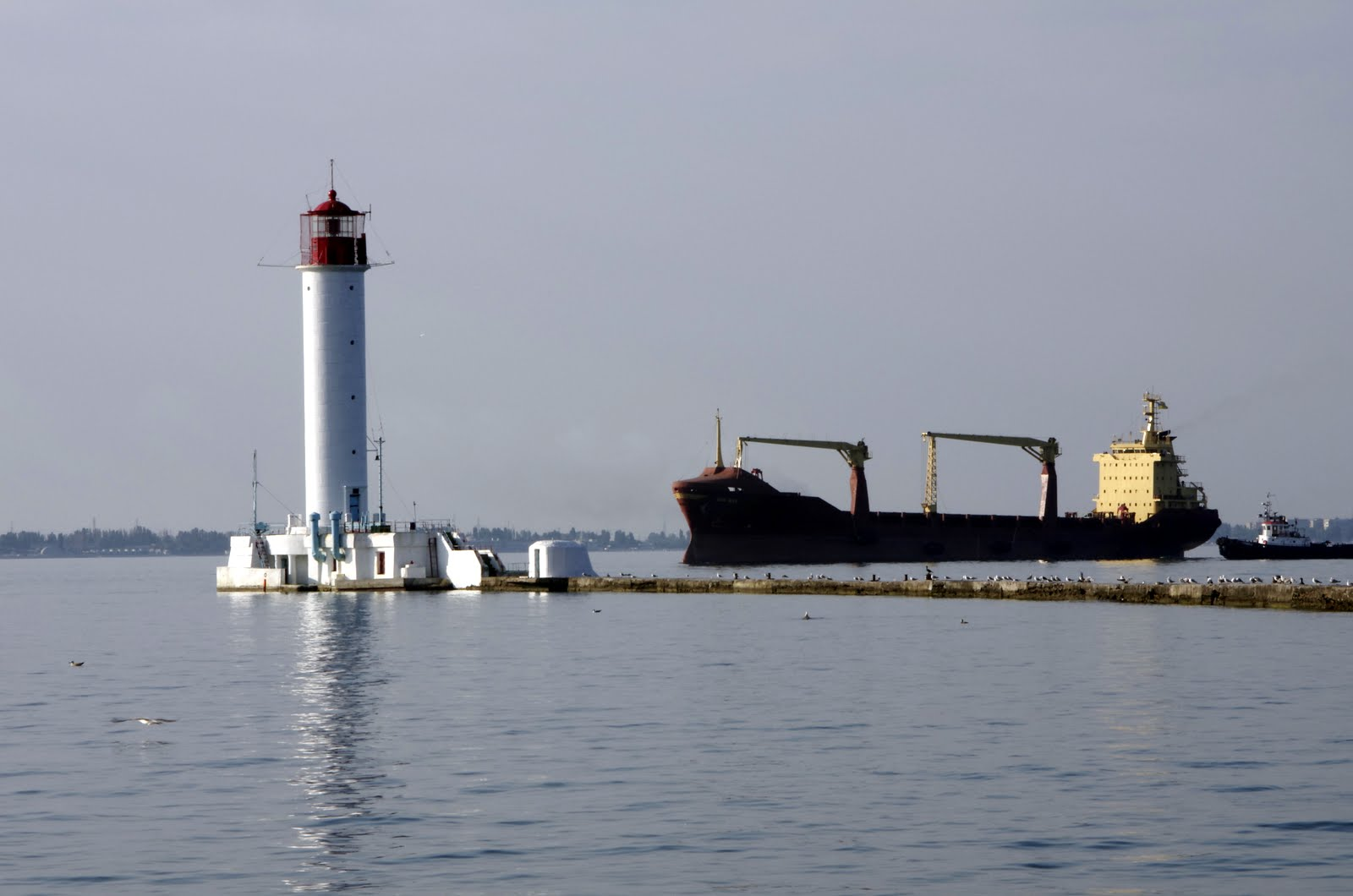
The Vorontsov Lighthouse in the Gulf of Odesa. The city is located on the Black Sea.

Odesa is located in the Black Sea Lowland in Southern Ukraine which being part of the greater Eastern European Plain gradually slopes towards the Black Sea and the Sea of Azov. The city lies on the northwestern coast of the Black Sea along the southwestern shore of the Gulf of Odesa, approximately 31 km (19 mi) north of the estuary of the Dniester river and some 443 km (275 mi) south of the Ukrainian capital Kyiv. The international border between Ukraine and the Republic of Moldova lies some 40 km (25 mi) west of the city.

The city is situated on terraced hills overlooking a small harbor. The average elevation at which the city is located is around 50 metres (160 feet). The maximum is 65 metres (213 feet) and minimum (on the coast) amounts to 4.2 metres (13.8 feet) above sea level. There are three large estuaries near the city: Kuialnyk, Khadzhibey and Sukhyi.

The city currently covers a territory of 162.42 km^{2} (63 sq mi). The population density for which is around 6,139 persons/km^{2}. Sources of running water in the city include the Dniester River, from which water is taken and then purified at a processing plant just outside the city. Being located in the south of Ukraine, the topography of the area surrounding the city is typically flat and there are no large mountains or hills for many kilometres around. Flora is of the deciduous variety and Odesa is known for its tree-lined avenues which, in the late 19th and early 20th centuries, made the city a favourite year-round retreat for the Russian aristocracy.

The city's location on the coast of the Black Sea has also helped to create a booming tourist industry in Odesa. The city's Arkadia beach has long been a favourite place for relaxation, both for the city's inhabitants and its visitors. This is a large sandy beach which is located to the south of the city centre. Odesa's many sandy beaches are considered to be quite unique in Ukraine, as the country's southern coast (particularly in the Crimea) tends to be a location in which the formation of stoney and pebble beaches has proliferated.

The coastal cliffs adjacent to the city are home to frequent landslides, resulting in a typical change of landscape along the Black Sea. Due to the fluctuating slopes of land, city planners are responsible for monitoring the stability of such areas, and for preserving potentially threatened building and other structures of the city above sea level near water. Also a potential danger to the infrastructure and architecture of the city is the presence of multiple openings underground. These cavities can cause buildings to collapse, resulting in a loss of money and business. Due to the effects of climate and weather on sedimentary rocks beneath the city, the result is instability under some buildings' foundations.

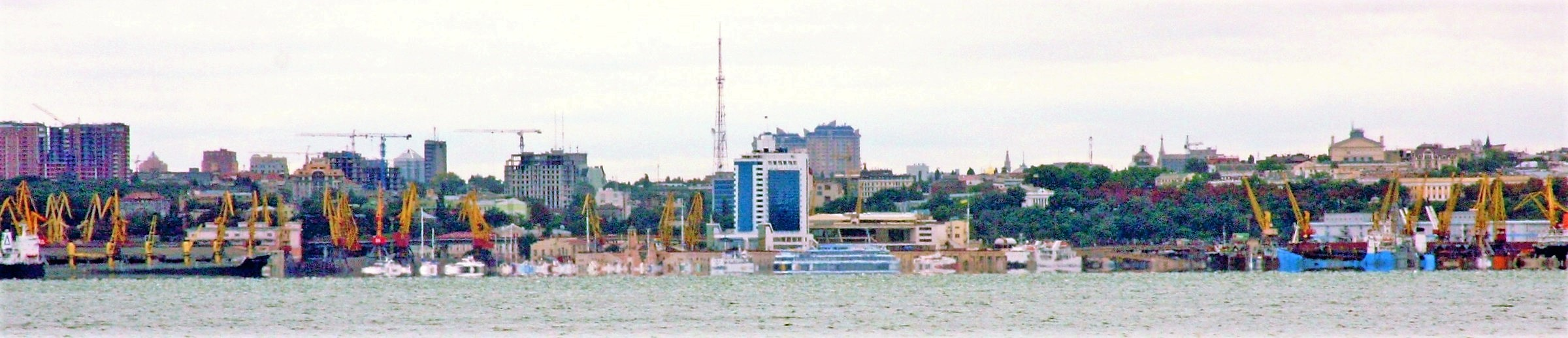
A panoramic view of central Odesa, as seen from the Black Sea

=== Climate ===
Odesa has a hot-summer humid continental climate (Dfa, using the 0 °C [32 °F] isotherm), bordering a cold semi-arid (BSk) as well as a humid subtropical climate (Cfa). This has, over the past few centuries, aided the city greatly in creating conditions necessary for the development of summer tourism. During the tsarist era, Odesa's climate was considered to be beneficial for the body, and thus many wealthy but sickly persons were sent to the city in order to relax and recuperate. This resulted in the development of spa culture and the establishment of a number of luxury hotels in the city. The average annual temperature of the sea is 13–14 °C (55–57 °F). Seasonal sea temperatures range from an average of 6 °C (43 °F) from January to March, to 23 °C (73 °F) in August. Typically, for a total of 4 months – from June to September – the average sea temperature in the Gulf of Odesa and the city's bay area exceeds 20 °C (68 °F).

The city typically experiences dry, cold winters which are relatively mild when compared to most of Ukraine, as they are marked by temperatures that rarely fall below −10 °C (14 °F). Summers see an increased level of precipitation, and the city often experiences warm weather with temperatures often reaching the high 20s and low 30s °C. Snow cover is light to moderate due to the city's location on the northern coast of the Black Sea, and municipal services rarely experience problems that can often be found in other, more northern Ukrainian cities. The city hardly ever faces sea ice formation.

Climate data for Odesa (1991–2020, extremes 1894–present)
Month	Jan	Feb	Mar	Apr	May	Jun	Jul	Aug	Sep	Oct	Nov	Dec	Year
Record high °C (°F)	15.7 (60.3)	19.2 (66.6)	24.8 (76.6)	29.4 (84.9)	33.3 (91.9)	37.2 (99.0)	39.3 (102.7)	38.0 (100.4)	35.4 (95.7)	31.1 (88.0)	26.0 (78.8)	16.9 (62.4)	39.3 (102.7)
Mean daily maximum °C (°F)	2.3 (36.1)	3.4 (38.1)	7.7 (45.9)	13.6 (56.5)	20.3 (68.5)	25.1 (77.2)	27.9 (82.2)	27.7 (81.9)	21.8 (71.2)	15.3 (59.5)	9.1 (48.4)	4.2 (39.6)	14.9 (58.8)
Daily mean °C (°F)	−0.4 (31.3)	0.4 (32.7)	4.3 (39.7)	10.0 (50.0)	16.2 (61.2)	20.8 (69.4)	23.4 (74.1)	23.1 (73.6)	17.8 (64.0)	12.0 (53.6)	6.3 (43.3)	1.5 (34.7)	11.3 (52.3)
Mean daily minimum °C (°F)	−2.7 (27.1)	−2.1 (28.2)	1.6 (34.9)	6.9 (44.4)	12.6 (54.7)	16.9 (62.4)	19.1 (66.4)	18.5 (65.3)	14.0 (57.2)	8.9 (48.0)	3.9 (39.0)	−0.8 (30.6)	8.1 (46.6)
Record low °C (°F)	−26.2 (−15.2)	−28.0 (−18.4)	−16.0 (3.2)	−5.9 (21.4)	0.3 (32.5)	5.2 (41.4)	7.5 (45.5)	7.9 (46.2)	−0.8 (30.6)	−13.3 (8.1)	−14.6 (5.7)	−19.6 (−3.3)	−28.0 (−18.4)
Average precipitation mm (inches)	43 (1.7)	35 (1.4)	35 (1.4)	28 (1.1)	39 (1.5)	47 (1.9)	45 (1.8)	40 (1.6)	44 (1.7)	37 (1.5)	39 (1.5)	38 (1.5)	470 (18.5)
Average extreme snow depth cm (inches)	2 (0.8)	2 (0.8)	1 (0.4)	0 (0)	0 (0)	0 (0)	0 (0)	0 (0)	0 (0)	0 (0)	0 (0)	1 (0.4)	2 (0.8)
Average rainy days	9	7	10	11	12	13	10	8	9	10	13	10	122
Average snowy days	11	10	6	0.4	0	0	0	0	0	0.2	4	9	41
Average relative humidity (%)	83.9	81.6	76.7	72.8	71.3	69.1	65.0	62.8	70.5	77.4	82.6	84.1	74.8
Mean monthly sunshine hours	55	88	153	219	299	315	348	323	239	158	63	48	2,308
Source 1: Pogoda.ru
Source 2: NOAA (humidity and sun 1991–2020)

== Demographics ==
Historical population
Year	Pop.	±% p.a.
1795	2,349	—
1800	6,000	+20.63%
1802	9,000	+22.47%
1813	35,000	+13.14%
1829	52,000	+2.51%
1832	60,000	+4.89%
1844	77,800	+2.19%
1858	104,200	+2.11%
1863	118,900	+2.67%
1873	193,513	+4.99%
1880	217,000	+1.65%
1885	240,600	+2.09%
1891	297,600	+3.61%
1897	403,815	+5.22%
1907	449,700	+1.08%
1910	506,000	+4.01%
1912	635,000	+12.02%
1914	481,500	−12.92%
1920	454,200	−0.97%
1925	325,354	−6.45%
1936	534,000	+4.61%
1939	601,651	+4.06%
1956	607,000	+0.05%
1959	667,182	+3.20%
1970	891,546	+2.67%
1979	1,046,133	+1.79%
1989	1,115,371	+0.64%
2001	1,029,049	−0.67%
2011	1,009,145	−0.20%
2022	1,010,537	+0.01%
at

=== Historical ethnic and national composition ===
- 1897
1. Russians: 198,233 people (49.09%)
2. Jews: 124,511 people (30.83%)
3. Ukrainians: 37,925 people (9.39%)
4. Poles: 17,395 people (4.31%)
5. Germans: 10,248 people (2.54%)
6. Greeks: 5,086 people (1.26%)
7. Tatars: 1,437 people (0.36%)
8. Armenians: 1,401 people (0.35%)
9. Belarusians: 1,267 people (0.31%)
10. French: 1,137 people (0.28%)
- 1926
1. Russians: 162,789 people (39.97%)
2. Jews: 153,243 people (36.69%)
3. Ukrainians: 73,453 people (17.59%)
4. Poles: 10,021 people (2.40%)
5. Germans: 5,522 people (1.32%)
6. Belarusians: 2,501 people (0.60%)
7. Armenians: 1,843 people (0.44%)
8. Greeks: 1,377 people (0.33%)
9. Bulgarians: 1,186 people (0.28%)
10. Moldovans: 1,048 people (0.25%)
- 1939
1. Jews: 200,961 people (33.26%)
2. Russians: 186,610 people (30.88%)
3. Ukrainians: 178,878 people (29.60%)
4. Poles: 8,829 people (1.46%)
5. Germans: 8,424 people (1.39%)
6. Bulgarians: 4,967 people (0.82%)
7. Moldovans: 2,573 people (0.43%)
8. Armenians: 2,298 people (0.38%)
- 1941
1. Ukrainians: 120,945 people (49.45%)
2. Russians: 92,584 people (37.85%)
3. Germans: 8,643 people (3.53%)
4. Poles: 7,488 people (3.06%)
5. Bulgarians: 4,928 people (2.01%)
6. Moldovans: 3,224 people (1.32%)
7. Tatars: 436 people (0.18%)
8. Lipovans: 429 people (0.17%)
- 2001
1. Ukrainians: 622,900 people (61.6%)
2. Russians: 292,000 people (29.0%)
3. Bulgarians: 13,300 people (1.3%)
4. Jews: 12,400 people (1.2%)
5. Moldovans: 7,600 people (0.7%)
6. Belarusians: 6,400 people (0.6%)
7. Armenians: 4,400 people (0.4%)
8. Poles: 2,100 people (0.2%)

Odesa Oblast is also home to many nationalities and minority ethnic groups, including Albanians, Armenians, Azeris, Crimean Tatars, Bulgarians, Georgians, Greeks, Jews, Poles, Roma, Romanians, Turks, among others. Up until the early 1940s the city had a large Jewish population. As the result of mass deportation to extermination camps during the Second World War, the city's Jewish population declined considerably. Since the 1970s, the majority of the remaining Jewish population emigrated to Israel and other countries, shrinking the Jewish community. Through most of the 19th century and until the mid-20th century, the largest ethnic group in Odesa was Russians, with the second largest ethnic group being Jews.

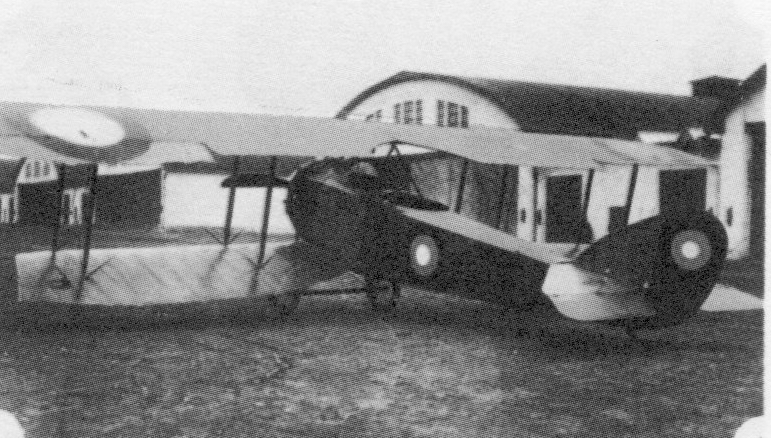
The Anatra DS Anasal, an aircraft built by Anatra factory, a manufacturing founded by an Italian of Odesa

Italians trace their presence in what later would become Odessa to as early as 1200, when Genoese "Ginestra" trade ships anchored there. In 1797 there were about 800 Italians in Odesa, equal to 10% of the total population. For more than a century the Italians of Odesa greatly influenced the culture, art, industry, society, architecture, politics and economy of the city. Among the works created by the Italians of Odesa there were the Potemkin Stairs and the Odesa Opera and Ballet Theater. At the beginning of the 19th century the Italian language became the second official language in Odesa, after Russian. Until the 1870s, Odesa's Italian population grew steadily. From the following decade this growth stopped, and the decline of the Italian community in Odesa began. The reason was mainly one, namely the gradual integration into the Slavic population of Odesa, i.e. Russians and Ukrainians. Surnames began to be Russianized and Ukrainianized. The revolution of 1917 sent many of them to Italy, or to other cities in Europe. In Soviet times, only a few dozen Italians remained in Odesa, most of whom no longer knew their own language. Over time they merged with the local population, losing the ethnic connotations of origin. They disappeared completely by World War II.

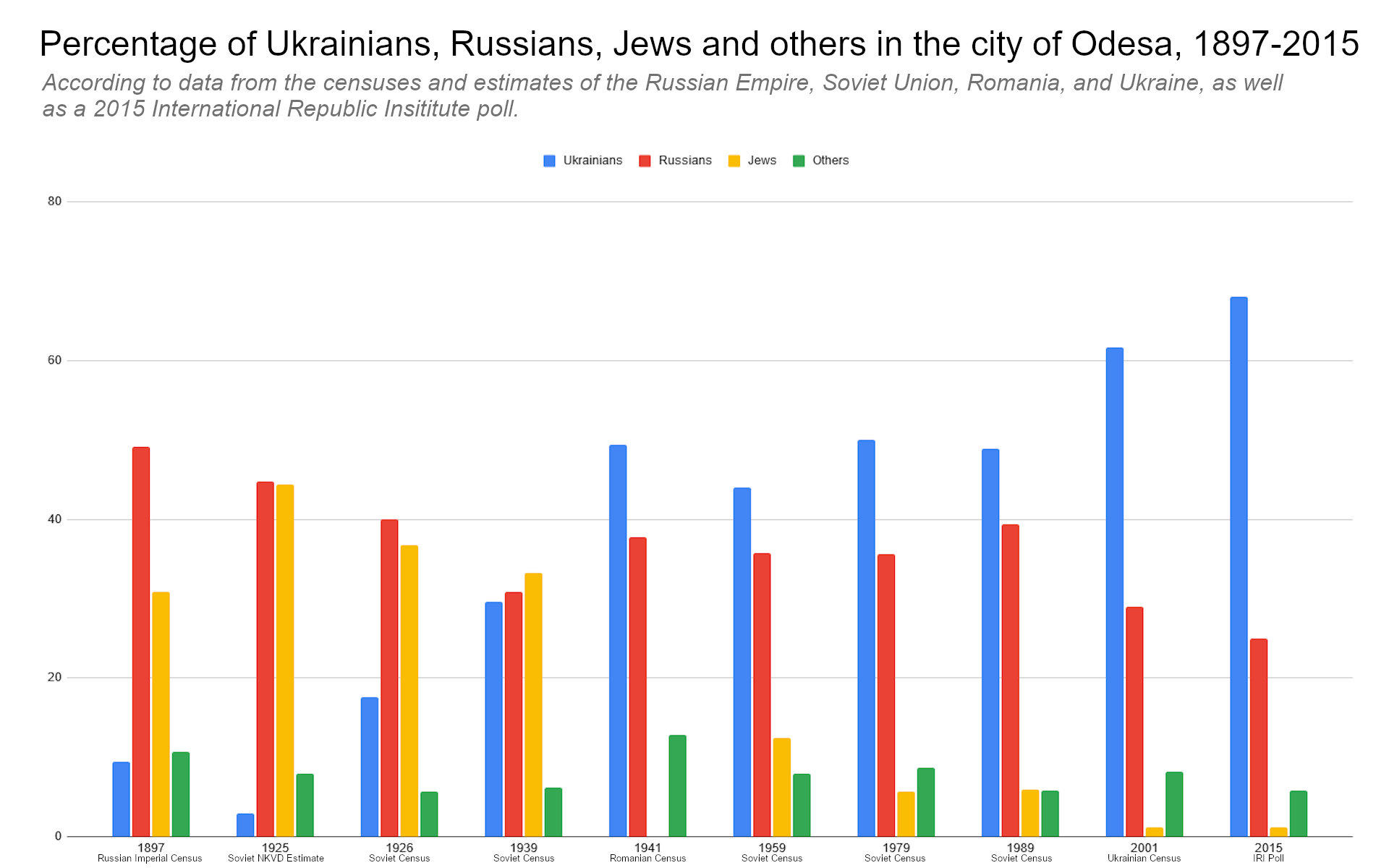
Historic ethnic and national composition of Odesa

The peculiarity of the ethnic composition of the modern population of the city of Odesa is its ethnic diversity. According to the 2001 Ukrainian census, Ukrainians made up 62% of the Odesa's inhabitants, Russians 29%, Bulgarians 6.1%, Moldovans 5%, Gagauz 1.1%, Jews 0.6%, Belarusians 0.5%, Armenians 0.3%, Roma 0.2%, Poles, Germans, Georgians, Azerbaijanis, Tartars, Greeks, Albanians and Arabs each 0.1%, and 1.9% were people of other nationalities. A 2015 study by the International Republican Institute found that 68% of Odesa's population were ethnic Ukrainians, and 25% were ethnic Russians.

=== Language ===
Distribution of the population of the city of Odesa by native language according to the 2001 census:

Language	Number	Percentage
Ukrainian	307 196	30.41%
Russian	654 128	64.75%
Other or undecided	48 974	4.84%
Total	1 010 298	100.00%

According to the Seventh Annual Ukrainian Municipal Survey, 96% of the residents of Odesa spoke some Russian at home and 29% spoke some Ukrainian at home (overlap due to a lot of people speaking both languages). Ukrainian is gaining in popularity: in 2021, the share of residents speaking some Ukrainian at home has increased almost 5 times from 6% in 2015 to 29% in 2021.

According to a survey conducted by the International Republican Institute in April–May 2023, 53% of the city's population has higher or incomplete higher education, 16% spoke Ukrainian at home and 80% spoke Russian.

58% of Odesa Oblast's population consider Ukrainian their native language, and 39% of population in Ukraine's South who consider Ukrainian their native language mostly speak Russian at home.

According to a sociological survey conducted by the Ilko Kucheriv Democratic Initiatives Foundation from 10 to 21 July 2023 in Odesa Oblast, the share of respondents who speak Ukrainian at home has increased to 42% (from 26% in 2021), while the share of those who speak Russian at home has dropped to 54%.

== Government and administrative divisions ==
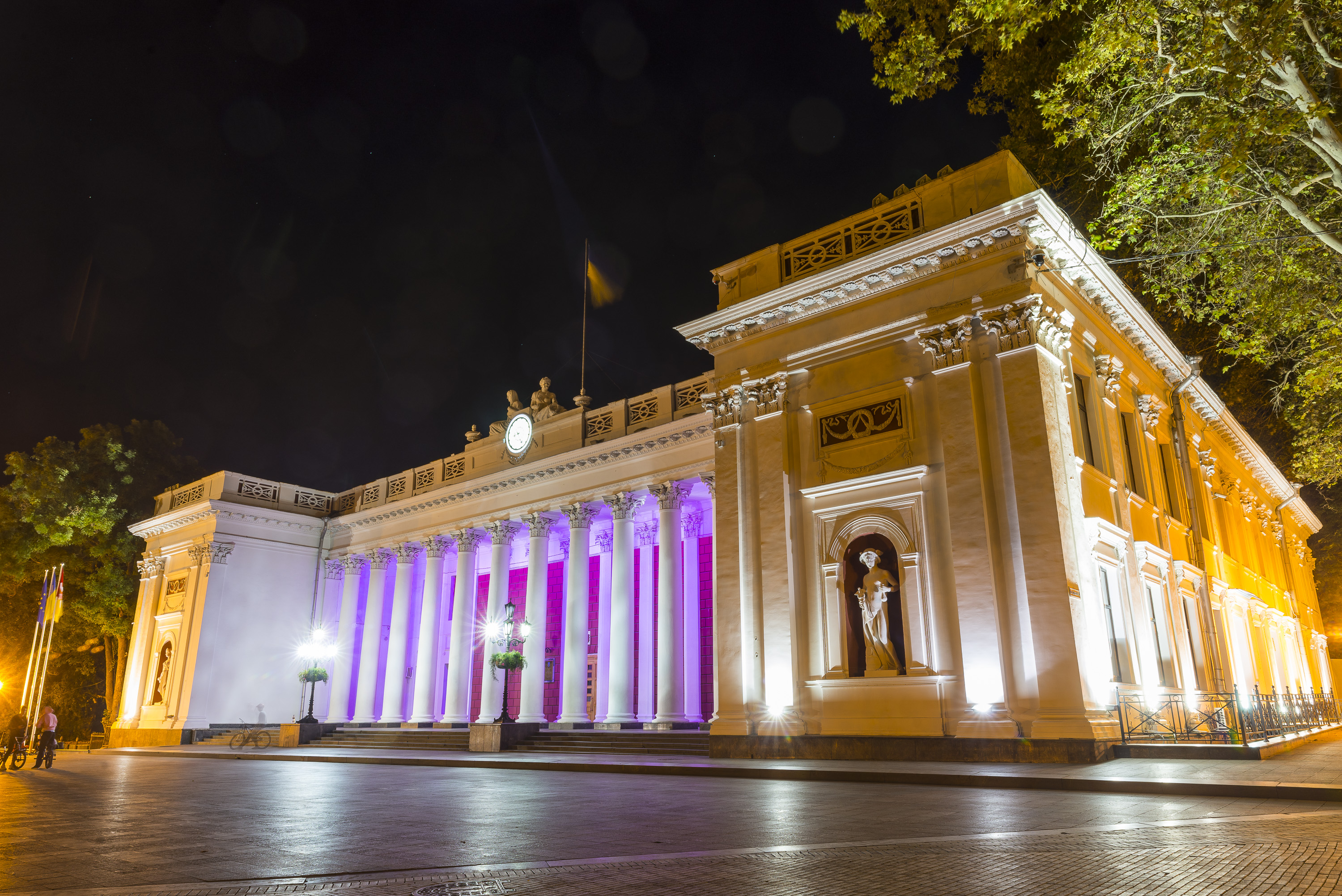
Odesa City Hall, the seat of the city's municipal authorities

Odesa is the administrative centre of Odesa Raion and Odesa Oblast, and it is the only constituent of Odesa urban hromada, one of the hromadas of Ukraine. The city of Odesa was previously governed by a mayor and city council which work cooperatively to ensure the smooth-running of the city and procure its municipal bylaws. The city's budget was also controlled by the administration. The mayoralty played the role of the executive in the city's municipal administration. Above all came the mayor who was elected by the city's electorate for five years in a direct election. In the 2015 mayoral election Hennadii Trukhanov was re-elected in the first round with 52,9% of the vote, and again in the second round of the 2020 election, receiving 54.28% of the vote.

On 15 October 2025 Ukrainian president Volodymyr Zelenskyy created the Odesa city military administration. Serhiy Lysak was appointed head of the military administration. Mayor Trukhanov was deemed ineligible to continue in office, as Ukrainian law prohibits officials from holding dual citizenship. One day earlier, Zelenskyy had signed a decree revoking Trukhanov's Ukrainian citizenship after the Security Service of Ukraine (SBU) released a Russian passport it said belonged to him.

There are five deputy mayors, each of which is responsible for a certain particular part of the city's public policy.

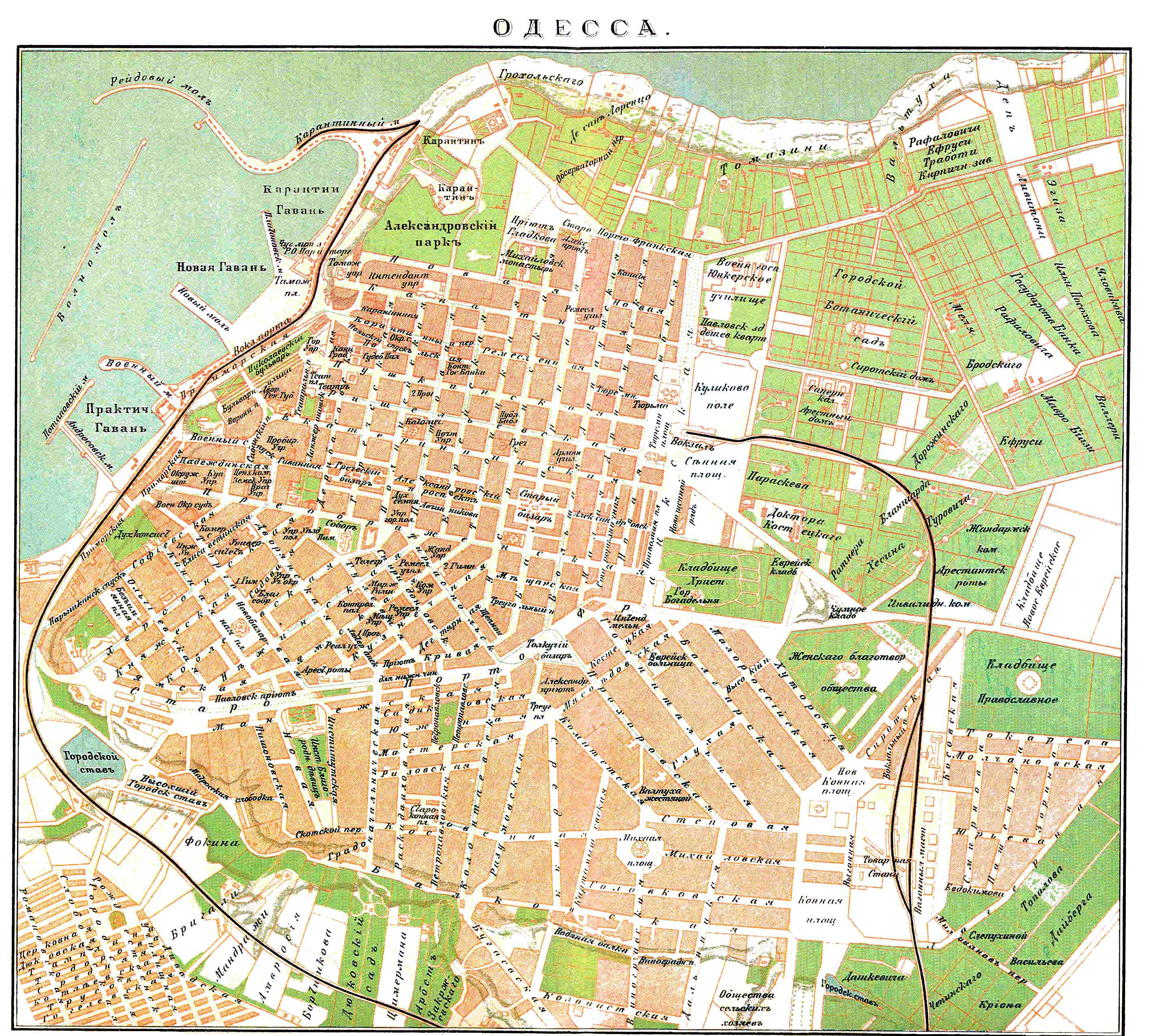
An old map of Odesa's city centre. North is to the left.

The City Council of the city makes up the administration's legislative branch, thus effectively making it a city 'parliament' or rada. The municipal council is made up of 120 elected members, who are each elected to represent a certain district of the city for a four-year term. The current council is the fifth in the city's modern history, and was elected in January 2011. In the regular meetings of the municipal council, problems facing the city are discussed, and annually the city's budget is drawn up. The council has seventeen standing commissions which play an important role in controlling the finances and trading practices of the city and its merchants.

The territory of Odesa is divided into four administrative urban districts:

- Kyivskyi District
- Khadzhybeiskyi District
- Prymorskyi District
- Peresypskyi District

In addition, every district has its own administration, subordinate to the Odesa City council, and with limited responsibilities.

== Cityscape ==
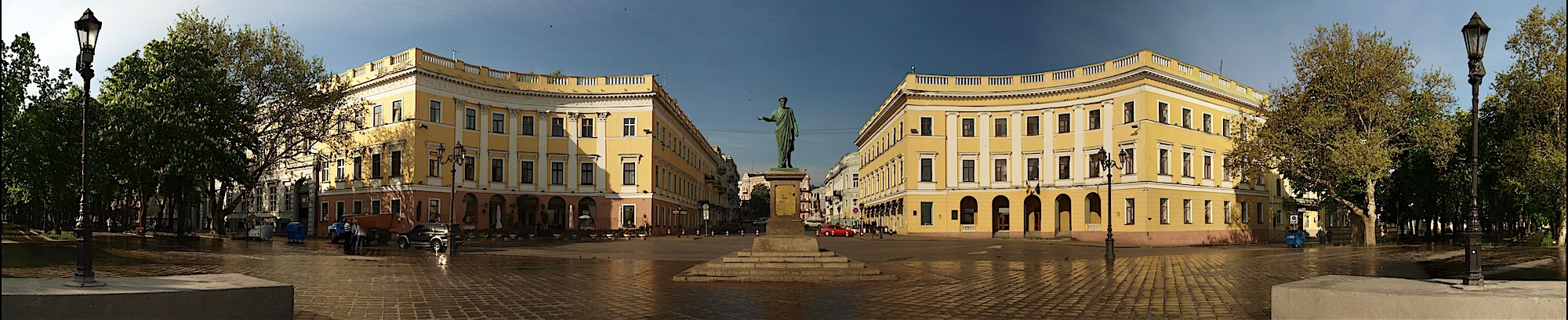
A panoramic view of Prymorsky Boulevard, at the top of the Potemkin Stairs

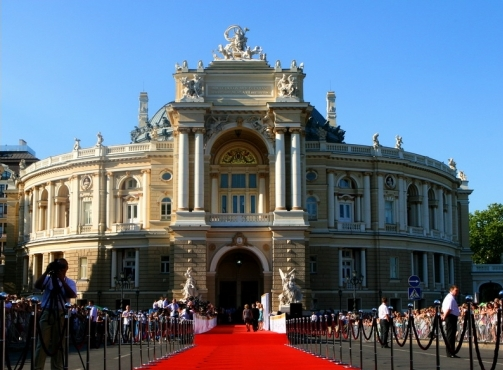
The Italian baroque facade of the Odesa Opera and Ballet Theater. It was started with the important contribution of the Italians of Odesa.

Many of Odesa's buildings have, rather uniquely for a Ukrainian city, been influenced by the Mediterranean style of classical architecture. This is particularly noticeable in buildings built by architects such as the Italian of Odesa Francesco Boffo, who in the early 19th-century built a palace and colonnade for the Governor of Odesa, Prince Mikhail Vorontsov, the Potocki Palace and many other public buildings.

In 1887 one of the city's most well known architectural monuments was completed – the theatre, which still hosts a range of performances to this day; it is widely regarded as one of the world's finest opera houses. The first opera house was opened in 1810 and destroyed by fire in 1873. The modern building was constructed by Fellner and Helmer in neo-baroque; its luxurious hall was built in the rococo style. It is said that thanks to its unique acoustics, even a whisper from the stage can be heard in any part of the hall. The theatre was projected along the lines of Dresden's Semperoper built in 1878, with its nontraditional foyer following the curvatures of the auditorium; the building's most recent renovation was completed in 2007.

Odesa's most iconic symbol, the Potemkin Stairs, is a vast staircase that conjures an illusion so that those at the top only see a series of large steps, while at the bottom all the steps appear to merge into one pyramid-shaped mass. The original 200 steps (now reduced to 192) were designed by Italian architect Francesco Boffo and built between 1837 and 1841. The steps were made famous by Sergei Eisenstein in his film, Battleship Potemkin.

Most of the city's 19th-century houses were built of limestone mined nearby. Abandoned mines were later used and broadened by local smugglers. This created a gigantic, complicated labyrinth of tunnels beneath Odesa, known as the Odesa catacombs. During World War II, the catacombs served as a hiding place for partisans and natural shelter for civilians, who were escaping airplane bombing.

Derybasivska Street, an attractive pedestrian avenue named after José de Ribas, the Neapolitan-born founder of Odesa and decorated Russian Navy Admiral from the Russo-Turkish War, is famous by its unique character and architecture. During the summer it is common to find large crowds of people leisurely sitting and talking on the outdoor terraces of numerous cafés, bars and restaurants, or simply enjoying a walk along the cobblestone street, which is not open to vehicular traffic and is kept shaded by the linden trees which line its route. A similar streetscape can also be found in that of Prymorsky Bulvar, a grand thoroughfare which runs along the edge of the plateau upon which the city is situated, and where many of the city's most imposing buildings are to be found.

As one of the biggest on the Black Sea, Odesa's port is busy all year round. The Odesa Seaport is located on an artificial stretch of the Black Sea coast, along with the north-western part of the Gulf of Odesa. The total shoreline length of Odesa's seaport is around 7.23 kilometres (4.49 mi). The port, which includes an oil refinery, container handling facility, passenger area and numerous areas for handling dry cargo, is lucky in that its work does not depend on seasonal weather; the harbour itself is defended from the elements by breakwaters. The port is able to handle up to 14 million tons of cargo and about 24 million tons of oil products annually, whilst its passenger terminals can cater for around 4 million passengers a year at full capacity.

As Odesa has been inhabited by peoples of different religions, it has a variety of religious buildings, such as the Orthodox Transfiguration Cathedral, Catholic Assumption of the Blessed Virgin Mary Cathedral, Lutheran St. Paul's Church, Brodsky Synagogue, and Al-Salam Mosque. There is also a number of historic cemeteries, including the Cossack Kuialnyk Cemetery.

In late 2022 one of the city's former central landmarks, the monument to the founders of Odesa with its statue of Catherine the Great, was dismantled and temporarily moved to the Odesa Fine Arts Museum.

=== Parks and gardens ===
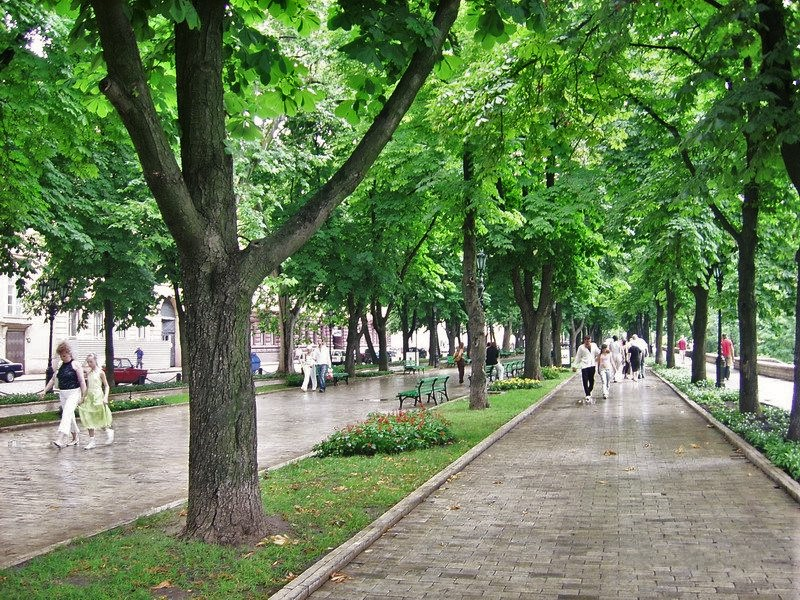
A park at Prymorskiy prospekt in Odesa

There are a number of public parks and gardens in Odesa, among these are the Preobrazhensky, Gorky and Victory parks, the latter of which is an arboretum. The city is also home to a university botanical garden, which recently celebrated its 200th anniversary, and a number of other smaller gardens.

The City Garden, or Gorodskoy Sad, is perhaps the most famous of Odesa's gardens. Laid out in 1803 by Felix De Ribas (brother of the founder of Odesa, José de Ribas) on a plot of urban land he owned, the garden is located right in the heart of the city. When Felix decided that he was no longer able to provide enough money for the garden's upkeep, he decided to present it to the people of Odesa in 1806.

The garden is home to a bandstand and is the traditional location for outdoor theater in the summertime. Numerous sculptures can also be found within the grounds, as well as a musical fountain, the waters of which are computer controlled to coordinate with the musical melody being played.

Odesa's largest park, Shevchenko Park (previously Alexander Park), was founded in 1875, during a visit to the city by Emperor Alexander II. The park covers an area of around 700 by 900 metres (2,300 by 3,000 feet) and is located near the centre of the city, on the side closest to the sea. Within the park there are a variety of cultural and entertainment facilities, and wide pedestrian avenues.

In the center of the park is the local top-flight football team's Chornomorets Stadium, the Alexander Column and municipal observatory. The Baryatinsky Bulvar is popular for its route, which starts at the park's gate before winding its way along the edge of the coastal plateau. There are a number of monuments and memorials in the park, one of which is dedicated to the park's namesake, the Ukrainian national poet Taras Shevchenko.

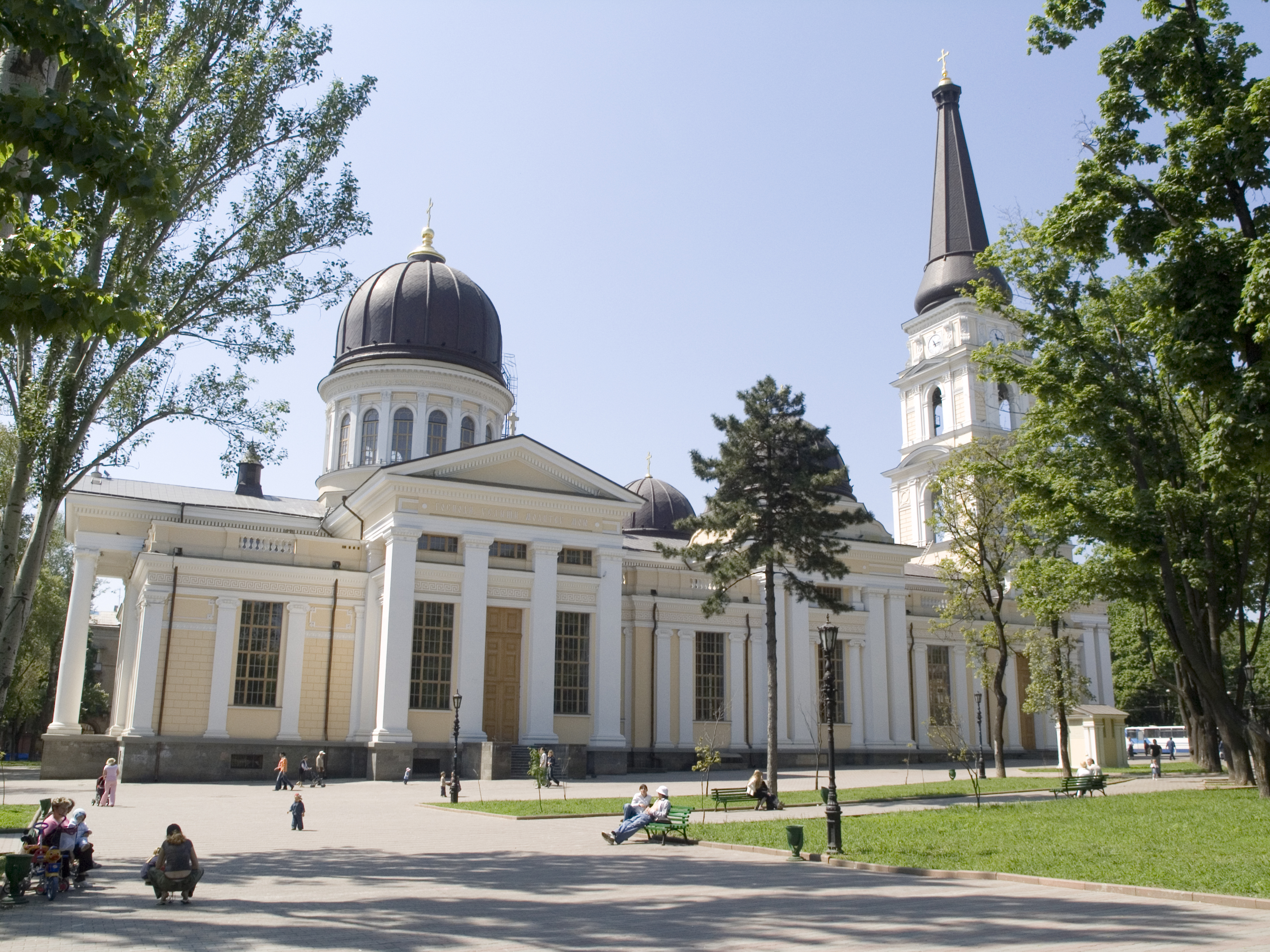
The city's Preobrazhensky Park surrounds its cathedral.

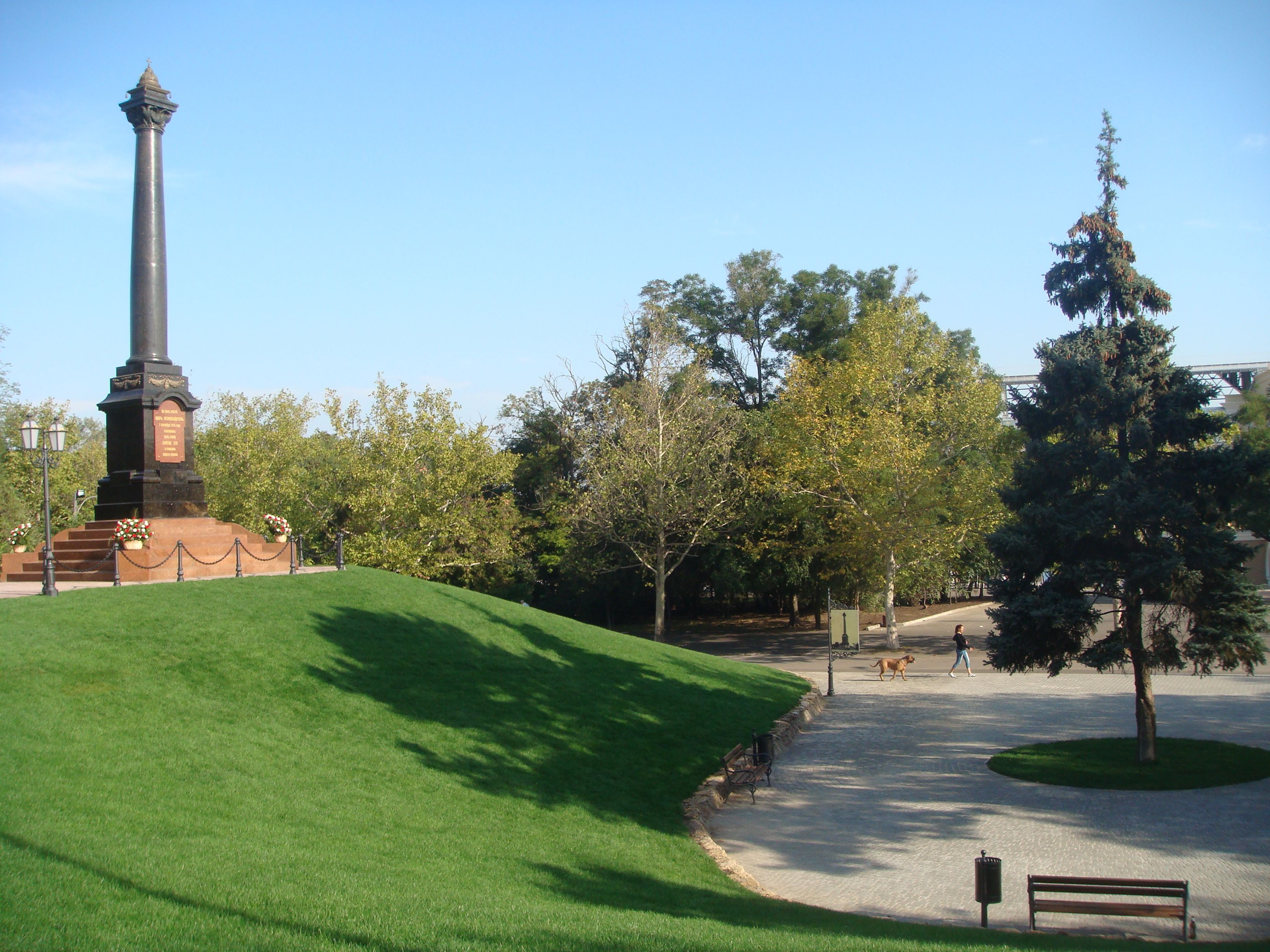
The Alexander Column in Schevchenko Park

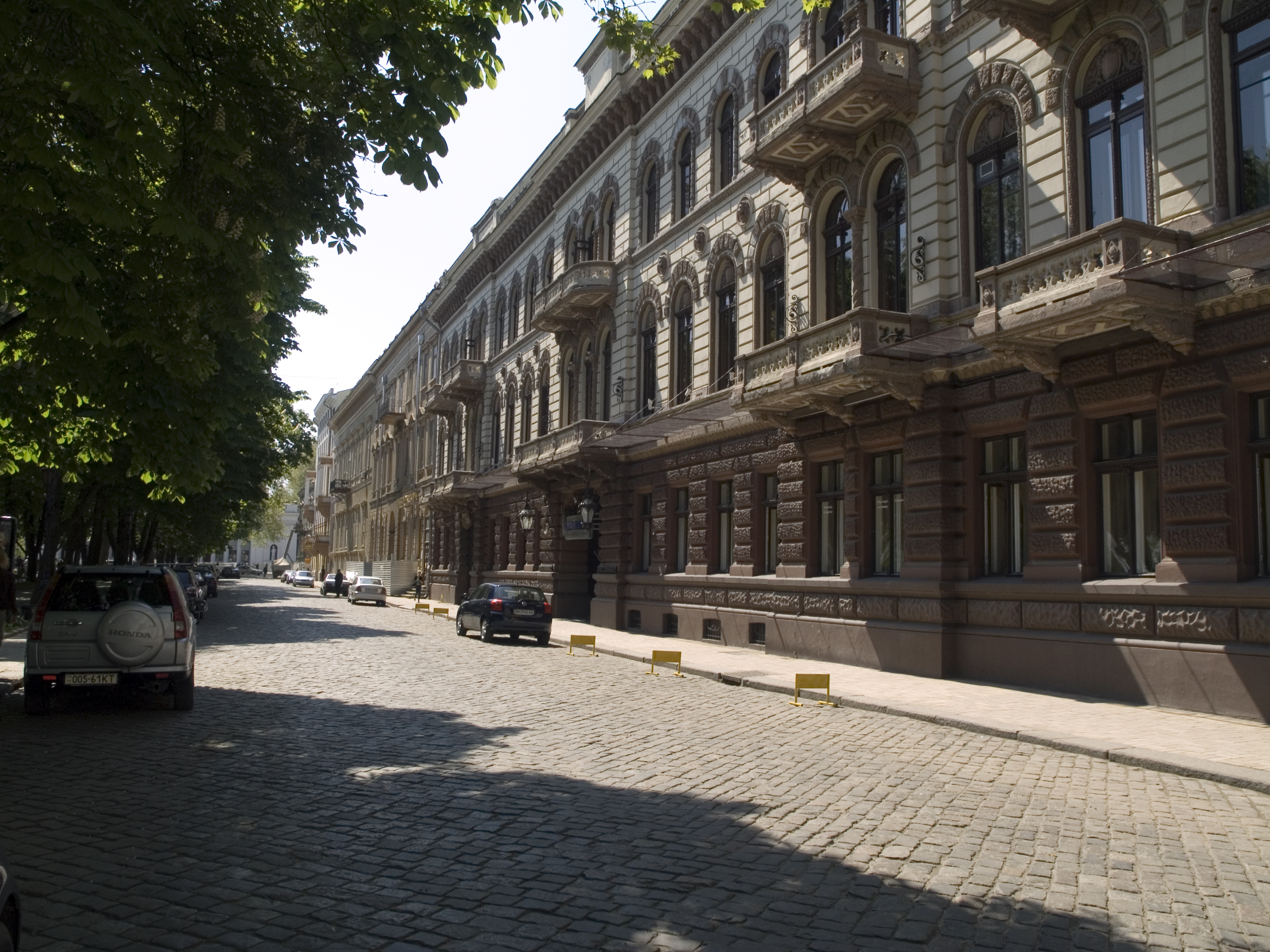
The Londonskaya Hotel, on Odesa's magnificent Prymorsky Bulvar, is one of the city's landmark buildings.

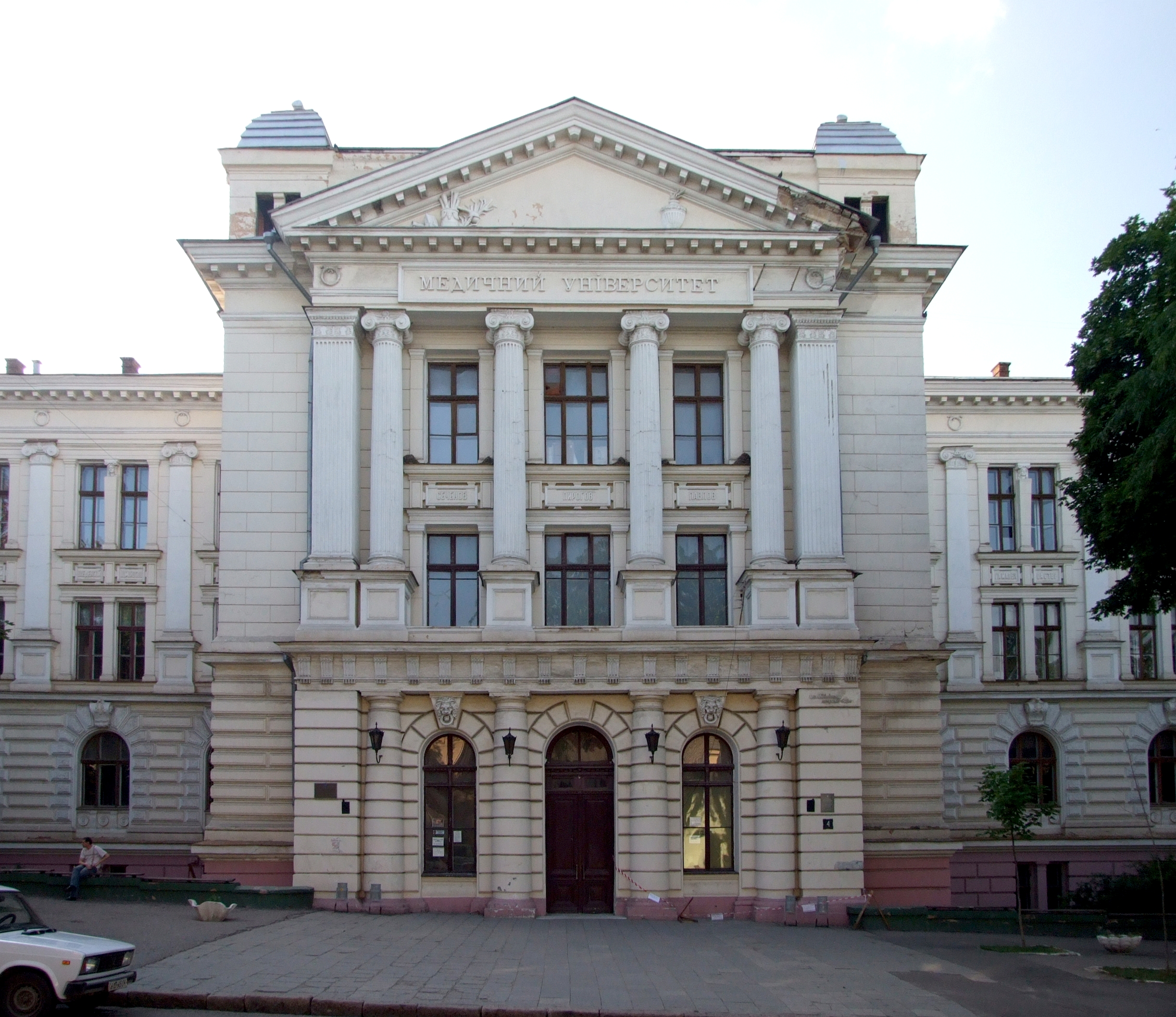
The main building of the Odesa National Medical University

== Education ==
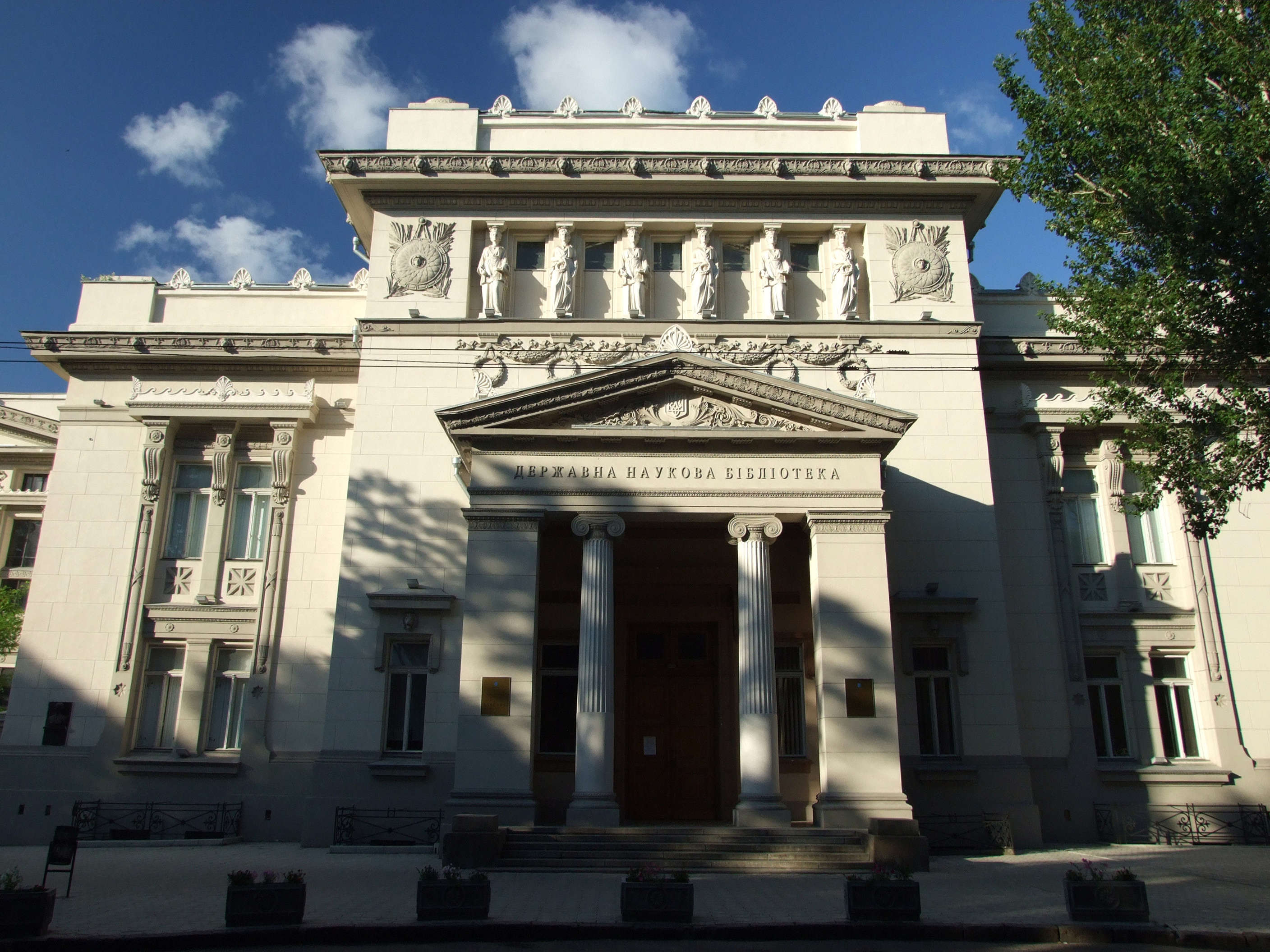
The Odesa National Scientific Library is a major research library and the centre for studies in southern Ukraine.

Odesa is home to several universities and other institutions of higher education. The city's best-known and most prestigious university is the Odesa 'I.I. Mechnykov' National University. This university is the oldest in the city and was first founded by an edict of Tsar Alexander II of Russia in 1865 as the Imperial Novorossian University. Since then the university has developed to become one of modern Ukraine's leading research and teaching universities, with staff of around 1,800 and total of thirteen academic faculties. Other than the National University, the city is also home to the 1921-inaugurated Odesa National Economic University, the Odesa National Medical University (founded 1900), the 1918-founded Odesa National Polytechnic University.

In addition to these universities, the city is home to the National University "Odesa Law Academy", the National Academy of Telecommunications, the Odesa State Environmental University and the Odesa National Maritime Academy. The last of these institutions is a highly specialised and prestigious establishment for the preparation and training of merchant mariners which sees around 1,000 newly qualified officer cadets graduate each year and take up employment in the merchant marines of numerous countries around the world. The South Ukrainian National Pedagogical University is also based in the city, this is one of the largest institutions for the preparation of educational specialists in Ukraine and is recognised as one of the country's finest of such universities.

In addition to all the state-run universities mentioned above, Odesa is also home to many private educational institutes and academies which offer highly specified courses in a range of subjects.

With regard to primary and secondary education, Odesa has many schools catering for all ages from kindergarten through to lyceum (final secondary school level) age. Most of these schools are state-owned and operated, and all schools have to be state-accredited in order to teach children.

== Culture ==
=== Museums, art and music ===
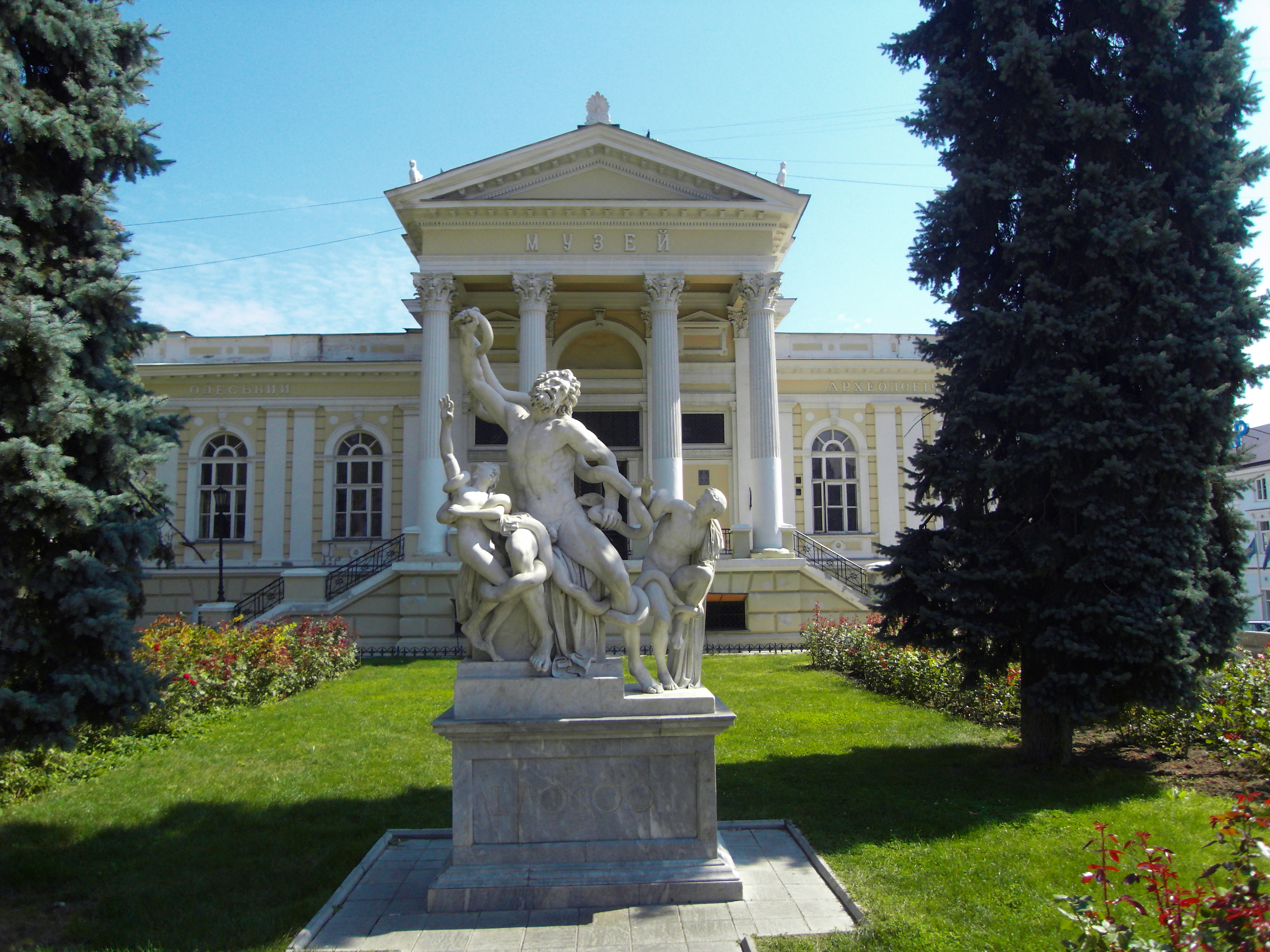
The Odesa Archaeological Museum was designed in the Neoclassical style just like many other landmarks of the city.

Fine Arts museum is the biggest art gallery in the city, which collection includes canvas mostly of Russian painters from 17th-21st centuries, icon collection and modern art. The Odesa Museum of Western and Eastern Art is big art museum; it has large European collections from the 16–20th centuries along with the art from the East on display. There are paintings from Caravaggio, Mignard, Hals, Teniers and Del Piombo.

Of note is Odesa's Alexander Pushkin Museum, which is dedicated to detailing the short time Pushkin spent in exile in Odesa, a period during which he continued to write. The poet also has a city street named after him, as well as a statue. Other museums in the city include the Odesa Archeological Museum, which is housed in a neoclassical building, the Odesa Numismatics Museum, the Odesa Museum of the Regional History, Museum of Heroic Defense of Odesa (411th Battery).

Among the city's public sculptures, two sets of Medici lions can be noted, at the Vorontsov Palace as well as in the Starosinnyi Garden.

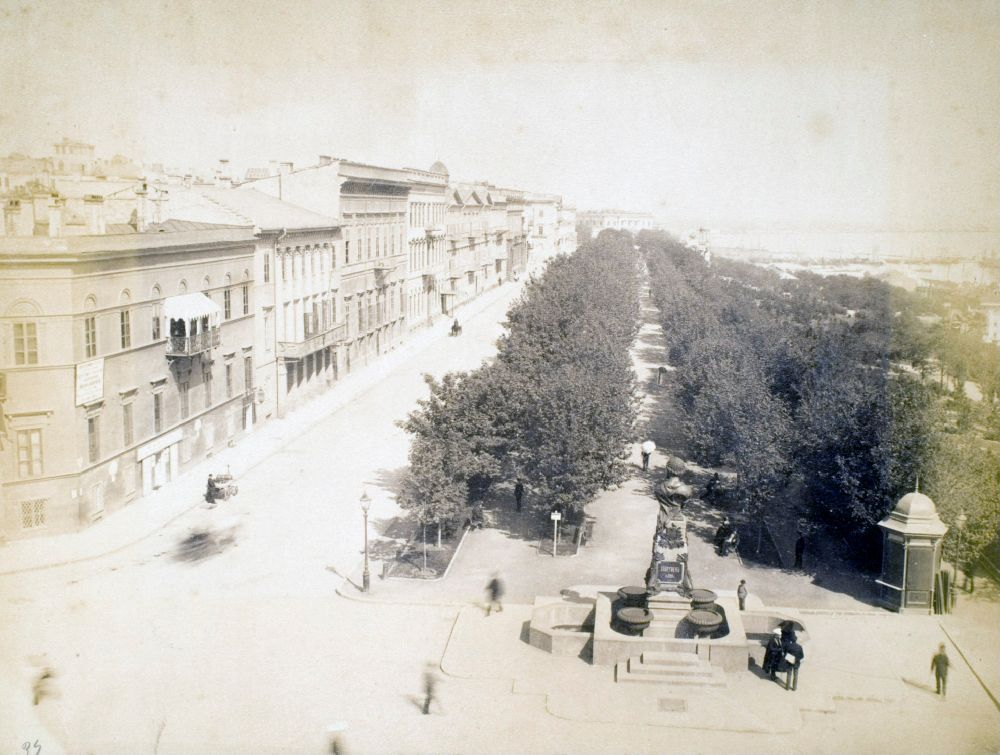
The Pushkin Monument, Odesa, 1889, Department of Image Collections, National Gallery of Art Library, Washington, D.C.

Jacob Adler, the major star of the Yiddish theatre in New York and father of the actor, director and teacher Stella Adler, was born and spent his youth in Odesa. The most popular Russian show business people from Odesa are Yakov Smirnoff (comedian), Mikhail Zhvanetsky (legendary humorist writer, who began his career as a port engineer) and Roman Kartsev (comedian). Zhvanetsky's and Kartsev's success in the 1970s, along with Odesa's KVN team, contributed to Odesa's established status as "capital of Soviet humor", culminating in the annual Humoryna festival, carried out around the beginning of April.

Odesa was also the home of the late Armenian painter Sarkis Ordyan (1918–2003), the Ukrainian painter Mickola Vorokhta and the Greek philologist, author and promoter of Demotic Greek Ioannis Psycharis (1854–1929). Yuri Siritsov, bass player of the Israeli Metal band PallaneX is originally from Odesa. Igor Glazer Production Manager Baruch Agadati (1895–1976), the Israeli classical ballet dancer, choreographer, painter, and film producer and director grew up in Odesa, as did Franco-Israeli École de Paris painter and sculptor Isaac Frenkel Frenel, Israeli artist and author Nachum Gutman (1898–1980). Israeli painter Avigdor Stematsky (1908–89) was born in Odesa.

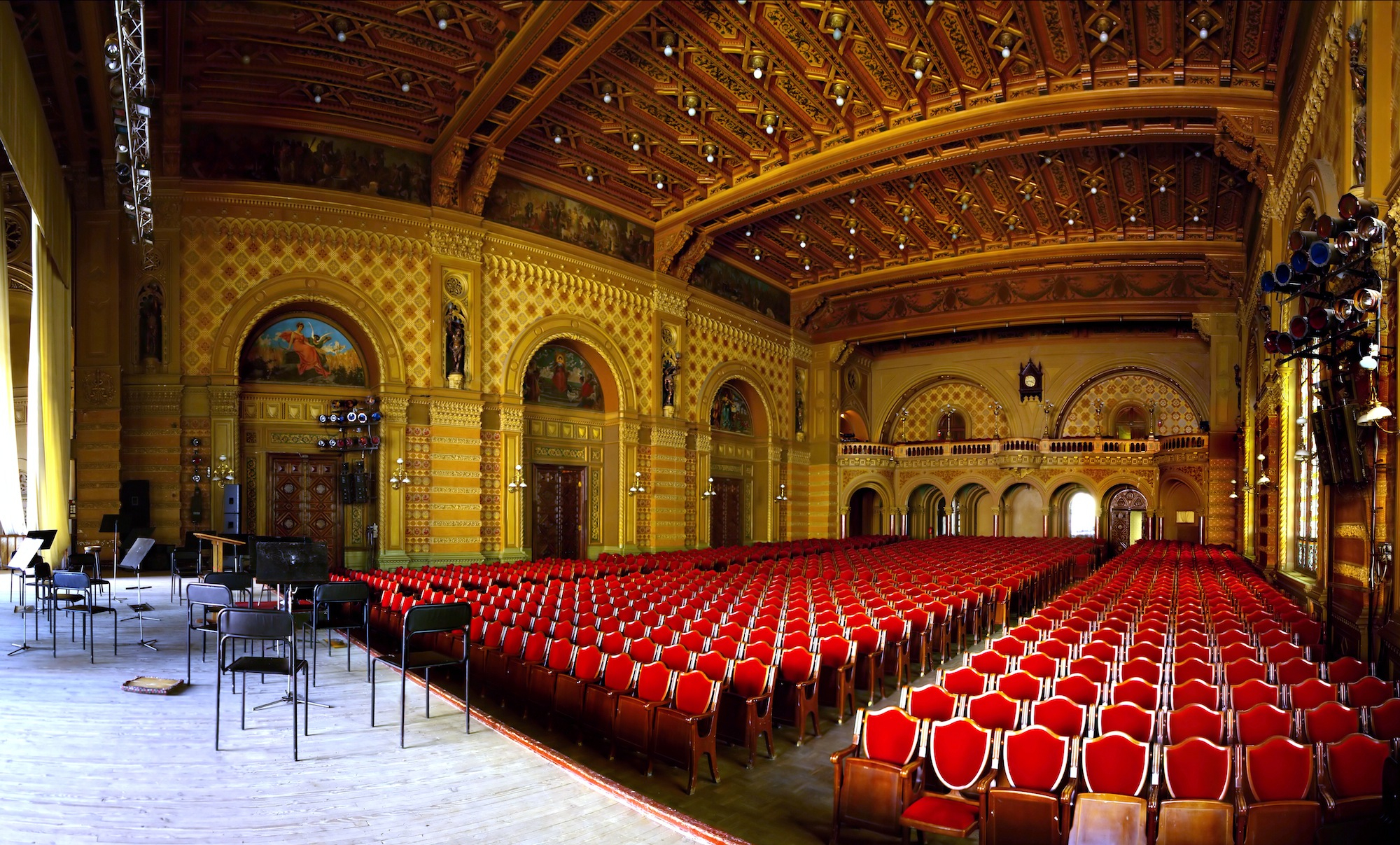
The main hall of the Odesa Philharmonic Society's theatre

Odesa produced one of the founders of the Soviet violin school, Pyotr Stolyarsky. It has also produced many musicians, including the violinists Nathan Milstein, David Oistrakh and Igor Oistrakh, Boris Goldstein, Zakhar Bron and pianists Sviatoslav Richter, Benno Moiseiwitsch, Vladimir de Pachmann, Shura Cherkassky, Emil Gilels, Maria Grinberg, Simon Barere, Leo Podolsky and Yakov Zak. (Note: Richter studied in Odesa but was not born there.)

The Odesa International Film Festival is also held in this city annually since 2010.

=== Literature ===
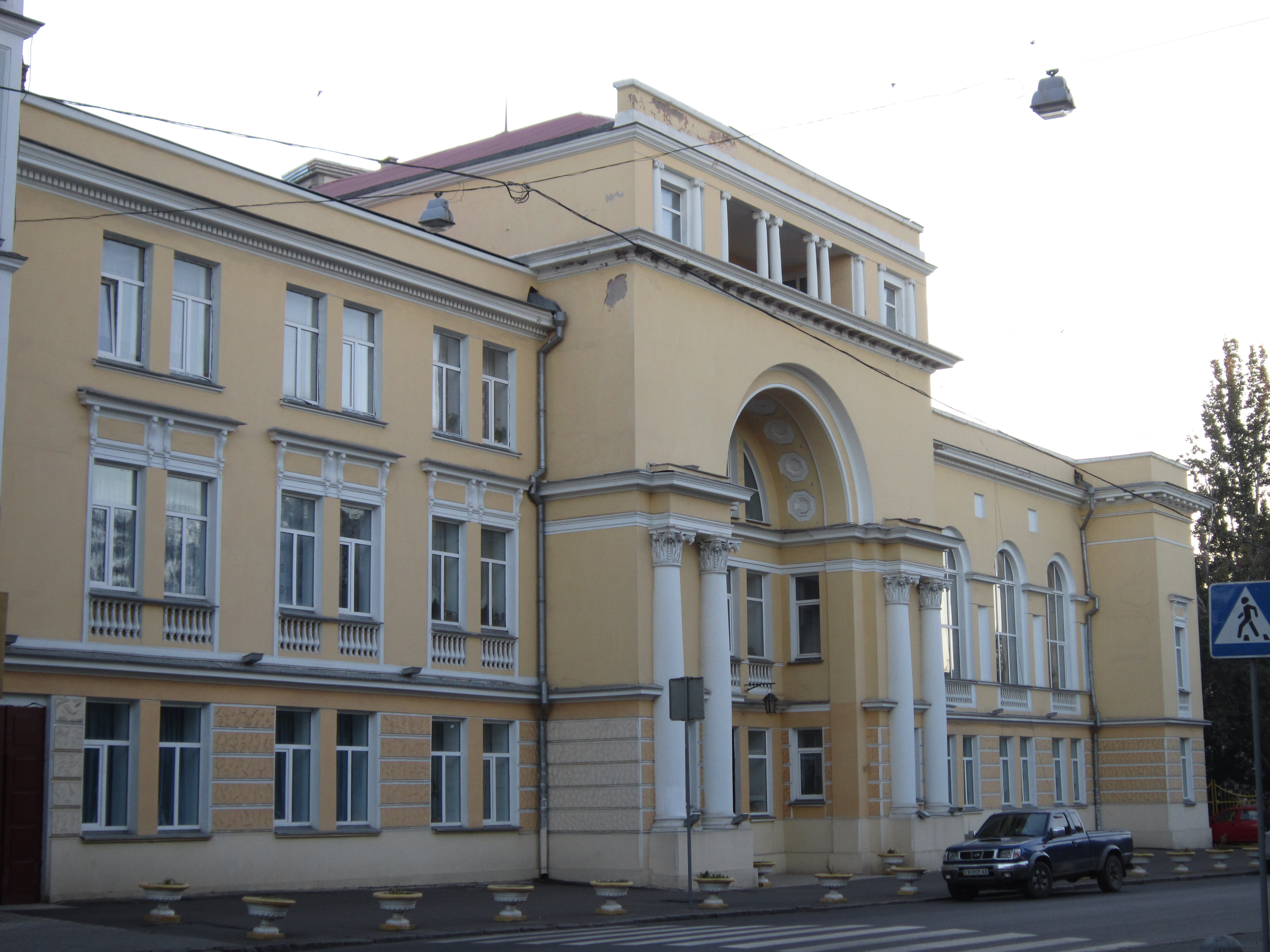
The School of Stolyarsky, founded in 1933, has long been recognised as a centre of musical excellence.

Poet Anna Akhmatova was born in Bolshoy Fontan near Odesa, however her further work was not connected with the city and its literary tradition. Odesa has produced many writers, including Isaac Babel, whose series of short stories, Odessa Tales, are set in the city. Edmund de Waal's best selling memoire, The Hare with the Amber Eyes is the story of his family, the Ephrussi, once a great banking dynasty based in Odesa.

Other Odesans are the duo Ilf and Petrov—authors of The Twelve Chairs, and Yuri Olesha, author of "The Three Fat Men". Vera Inber, a poet and writer, as well as the poet and journalist Margarita Aliger, were both born in Odesa. The Italian writer, Slavist and anti-fascist dissident Leone Ginzburg was born in Odesa into a Jewish family, and then went to Italy where he grew up and lived. The Hebrew author and poet Haim Bialik established a publishing house and worked in the city from the 1890s to 1911.

One of the most prominent pre-war Soviet writers, Valentin Kataev, was born here and began his writing career as early as high school (gymnasia). Before moving to Moscow in 1922, he made quite a few acquaintances here, including Yury Olesha and Ilya Ilf (Ilf's co-author Petrov was in fact Kataev's brother, Petrov being his pen-name). Kataev became a benefactor for these young authors, who would become some of the most talented and popular Russian writers of this period. In 1955 Kataev became the first chief editor of the Youth (Russian: Юность, Yunost'), one of the leading literature magazines of the Ottepel of the 1950s and 1960s.

These authors and comedians played a great role in establishing the "Odesa myth" in the Soviet Union. Odesans were and are viewed in the ethnic stereotype as sharp-witted, street-wise and eternally optimistic. These qualities are reflected in the "Odesa dialect", which borrows chiefly from the characteristic speech of the Odesan Jews, and is enriched by a plethora of influences common for the port city.

The "Odesite speech" became a staple of the "Soviet Jew" depicted in a multitude of jokes and comedy acts, in which a Jewish adherent served as a wise and subtle dissenter and opportunist, always pursuing his own well-being, but unwittingly pointing out the flaws and absurdities of the Soviet regime. The Odesan Jew in the jokes always "came out clean" and was, in the end, a lovable character – unlike some of other jocular nation stereotypes such as The Chukcha, The Ukrainian, The Estonian or The American.

=== Resorts and health care ===
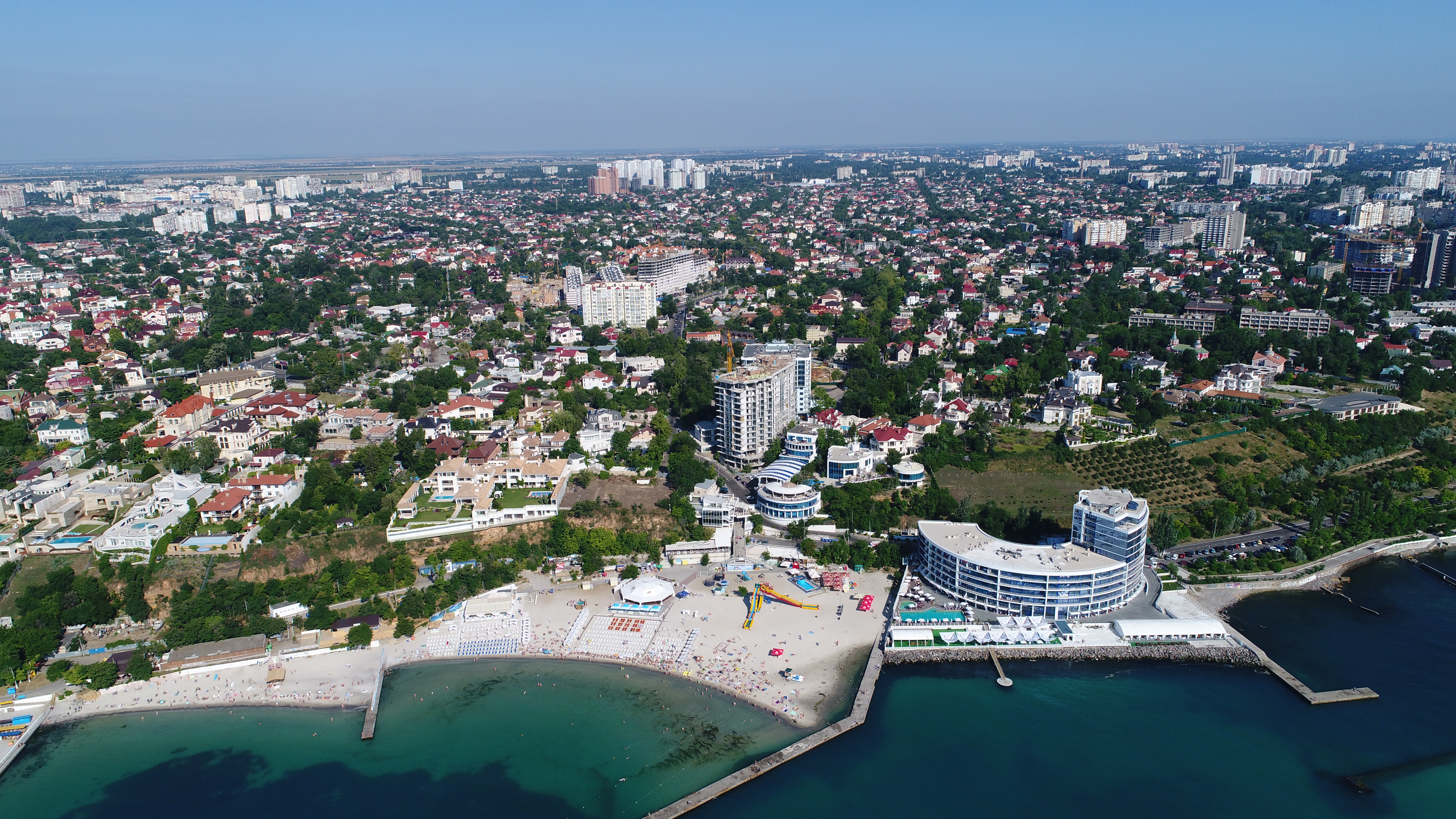
An aerial image of Beach Chayka

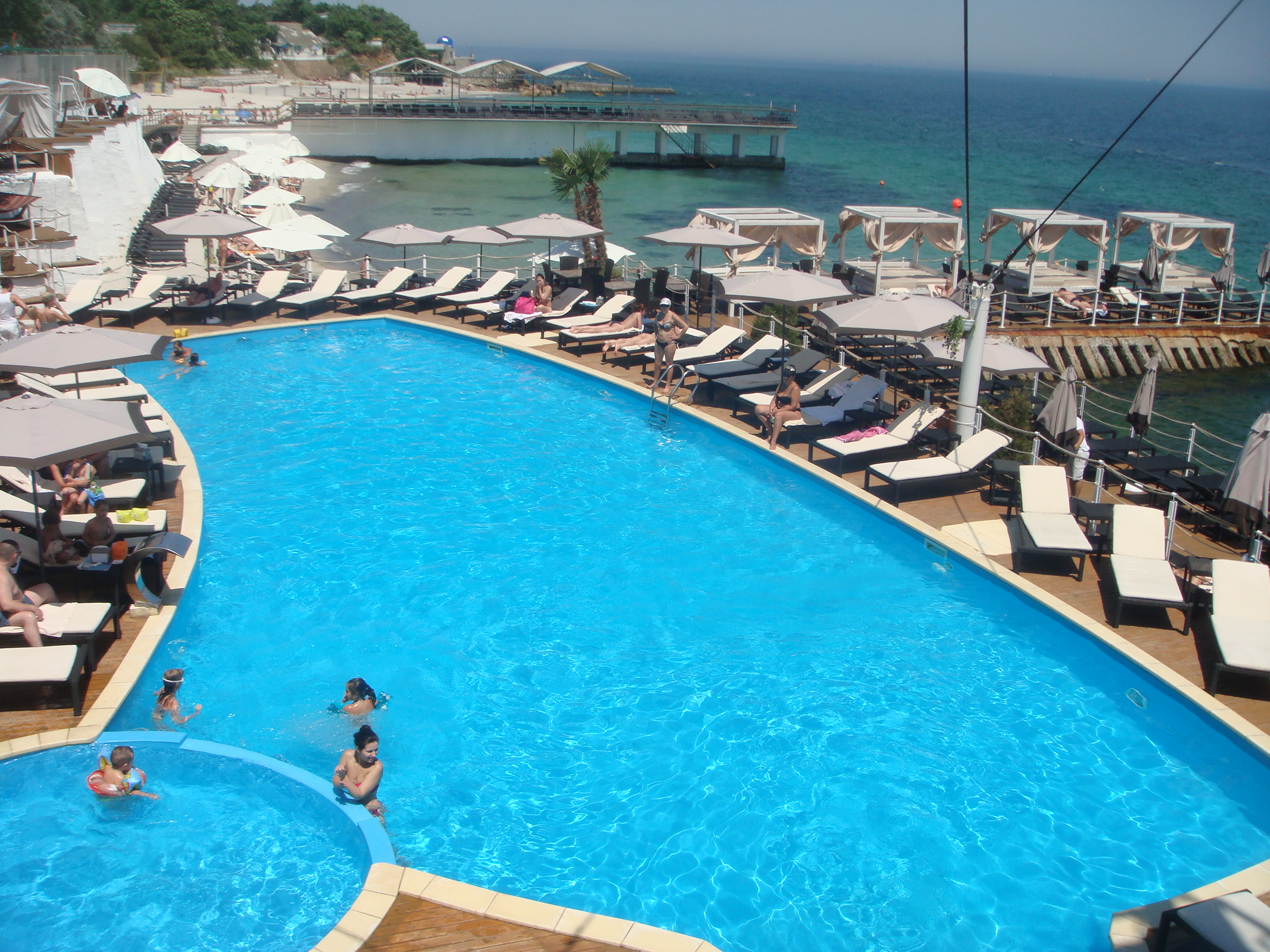
Beaches of Arcadia

Odesa is a popular tourist destination, with many therapeutic resorts in and around the city. The city's Filatov Institute of Eye Diseases & Tissue Therapy is one of the world's leading ophthalmology clinics.

=== Celebrations and holidays ===
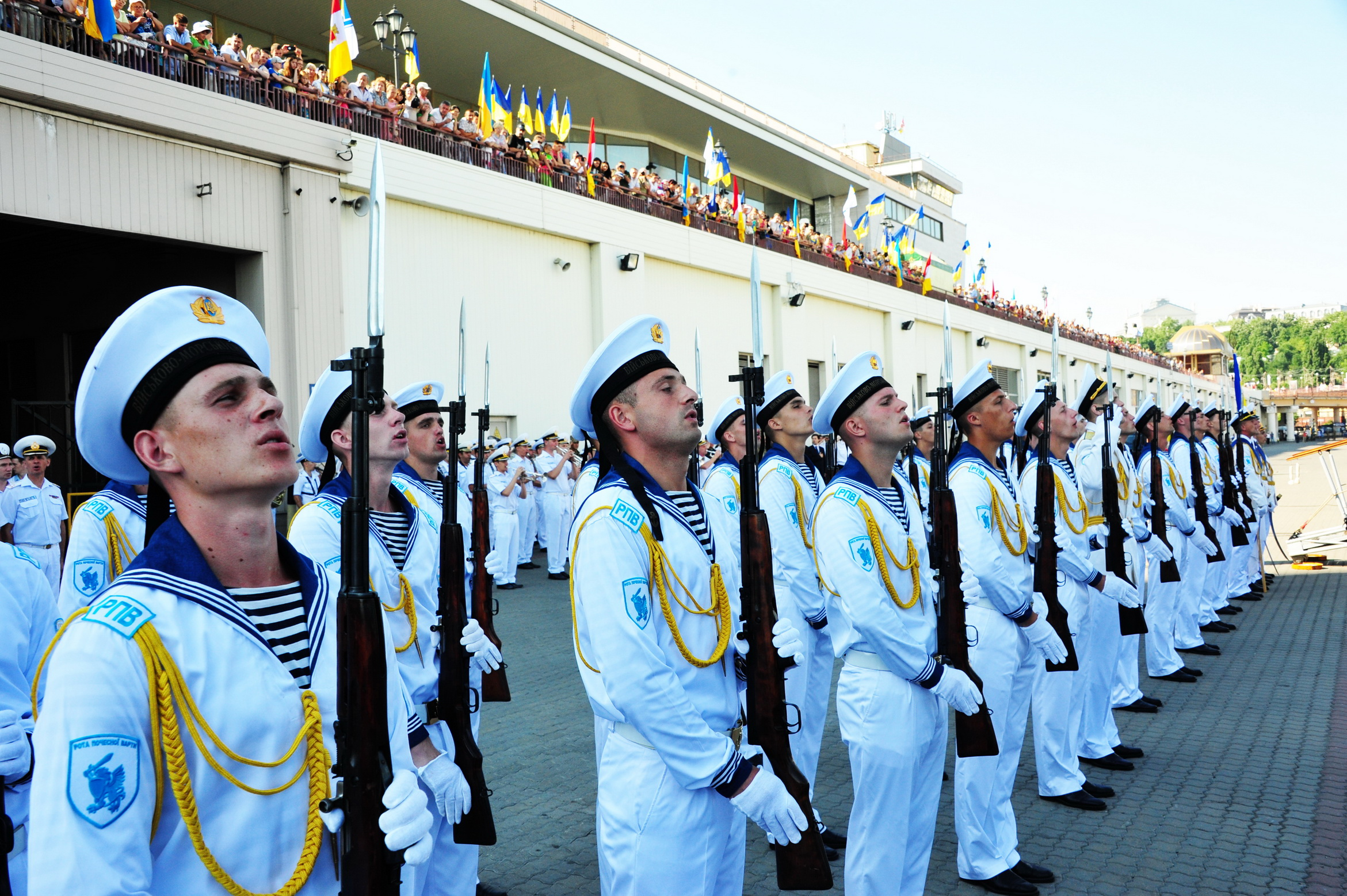
Ukrainian Navy Honour Guards during the Navy Day celebrations in Odesa in 2016

April Fools' Day, held annually on 1 April, is one of the most celebrated festivals in the city. Practical joking is a central theme throughout, and Odesans dress in unique, colorful attire to express their spontaneous and comedic selves. The tradition has been celebrated since the early 1970s, when the humor of Ukraine's citizens were drawn to television and the media, further developing into a mass festival. Large amounts of money are made from the festivities, supporting Odesa's local entertainers and shops.

=== Notable people ===
- Vladimir de Pachmann (1848–1933) a pianist of Russian-German ethnicity noted for performing the works of Chopin, was from Odesa.
- Yefrosyniya Zarnytska (1867–1936), actress
- Pyotr Schmidt (1867–1906) (better known as "Lieutenant Schmidt"), one of the leaders of the Sevastopol uprising, was born in Odesa.
- Haim Nahman Bialik (1873 - 1934), a poet and innovator in the Hebrew and Yiddish languages, he came to Odesa aged 18, inspired by his admiration for authors such as and Ahad Ha'am Mendele Mocher Sforim and worked there from the 1890s to 1911. He was commonly known as the national Hebrew poet.
- Sidney Reilly (ca.1873–1925), who was employed by William Melville (1850–1918) as one of the first spies of the British Secret Service Bureau, was a native Odesan. Another intelligence agent from Odesa was Genrikh Lyushkov (1900–1945), who joined the Odesa Cheka in 1920 and reached two-star rank in the NKVD before fleeing to Japanese-occupied Manchuria in 1938 to avoid being murdered.
- The composer Jacob Weinberg (1879–1956) was born in Odesa. He composed over 135 works and was the founder of the Jewish National Conservatory in Jerusalem before immigrating to the U.S. where he became "an influential voice in the promotion of American Jewish music".
- Ze'ev Jabotinsky (1880–1940), was born in Odesa, and largely developed his version of Zionism there in the early 1920s.
- Rodion Malinovsky (1898–1967), Marshal of the Soviet Union, military commander in World War II and Defense Minister of the Soviet Union, was born in Odesa, whilst renowned Nazi hunter Simon Wiesenthal (1908–2005) lived in the city in 1934/1935.
- Alexander Olshanetsky (1892 – 1946), an American composer, conductor, and violinist. He was a major figure within the Yiddish theatre scene in New York City, born in Odesa.
- Stasys Pundzevičius (1893–1980), Chief of the Lithuanian Air Force in the interwar Lithuania, was born in Odesa.
- Yaakov Dori (1899–1973), the first Chief of Staff of the Israel Defense Forces, and President of the Technion – Israel Institute of Technology, was born in Odesa, as was Israel Dostrovsky (1918–2010), Israeli physical chemist who was the fifth president of the Weizmann Institute of Science.
- Yitzhak Frenkel Frenel (1899–1981), a native Odesan painter and sculptor of the École de Paris who brought to Israel the influence of modern art and was its first abstract artist. He emigrated to Israel on the Ruslan in 1919.
- Emil Grigoryevich Gilels (1916–1985), widely regarded as one of the greatest pianists of all time, was born in Odesa.
- Janka Bryl (1917–2006), Belarusian writer, was born in Odesa.
- Mikhail Zhvanetsky (1934–2020), writer, satirist and performer best known for his shows targeting different aspects of the Soviet and post-Soviet everyday life, was born in Odesa.
- Yuriy Bazhal (born 1950), Ukrainian scientist, professor, academic.
- VitaliV (Vitali Vinogradov) (born 1957), an artist and sculptor based in London since 1989, was born in Odesa.
- Savva Libkin (born 1961), a Ukrainian restaurateur, popularizer of Odesa's cuisine.
- Leonid Radvinsky (1982–2026), a Ukrainian-American entrepreneur.
- Valeria Lukyanova (born 1985), a girl from Odesa who looks very similar to a Barbie doll, has received attention on the Internet and from the media for her doll-like appearance.
- Kostyantyn Mykolayovych Bocharov (born 1997), better known by his stage name Mélovin is a native of Odesa. He is best known for winning season six of X-Factor Ukraine and for representing Ukraine in the Eurovision Song Contest 2018, singing the song "Under the Ladder".

== Economy ==
Odesa's economy largely stems from its traditional role as a port city. The nearly ice-free port lies near the mouths of the Dnieper, the Southern Bug, the Dniester and the Danube rivers, which provide good links to the hinterland. During the Soviet period (until 1991) the city functioned as the USSR's largest trading port; it continues in a similar role as independent Ukraine's busiest international port. The port complex contains an oil and gas transfer and storage facility, a cargo-handling area and a large passenger port. In 2007 the Port of Odesa handled 31,368,000 tonnes of cargo.

The port of Odesa is one of the Ukrainian Navy's most important bases on the Black Sea. Rail transport is an important sector of the economy in Odesa – largely due to the role it plays in delivering goods and imports to and from the city's port. The Container Terminal Odesa (CTO) in the port is the largest container terminal in Ukraine. It has been operated by the Hamburg-based HHLA Group since 2001 and, in addition to containers, also handles bulk goods, general cargo and project cargo. This means that Odesa is networked with the ports of Hamburg, Muuga and Trieste via the logistics group HHLA.

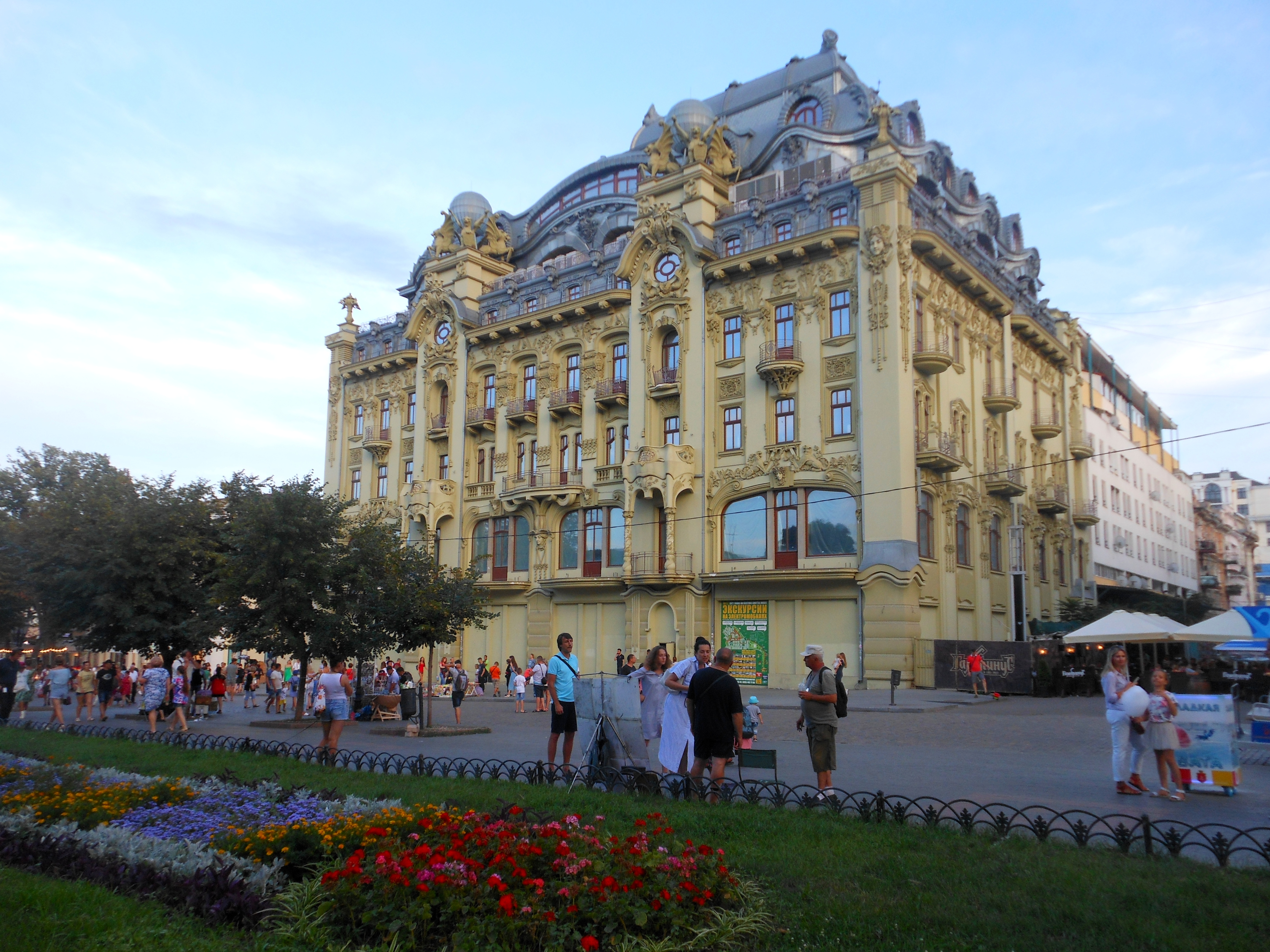
Hotel Grand Moscow in Odesa

Industrial enterprises located in and around the city include those dedicated to fuel refinement, machine building, metallurgy, and other types of light industry such as food preparation, timber plants and chemical industry. Agriculture is a relatively important sector in the territories surrounding the city. The Seventh-Kilometer Market is a major commercial complex on the outskirts of the city where private traders now operate one of the largest market complexes in Eastern Europe. The market has roughly 6,000 traders and an estimated 150,000 customers per day.

Daily sales, according to the Ukrainian periodical Dzerkalo Tyzhnia, were believed to be as high as US$20 million in 2004. With a staff of 1,200 (mostly guards and janitors), the market is also the region's largest employer. It is owned by local land and agriculture tycoon Viktor A. Dobrianskyi and three partners of his. Tavria-V is the most popular retail chain in Odesa. Key areas of business include: retail, wholesale, catering, production, construction and development, private label. Consumer recognition is mainly attributed to the high level of service and the quality of services. Tavria-V is the biggest private company and the biggest tax payer.

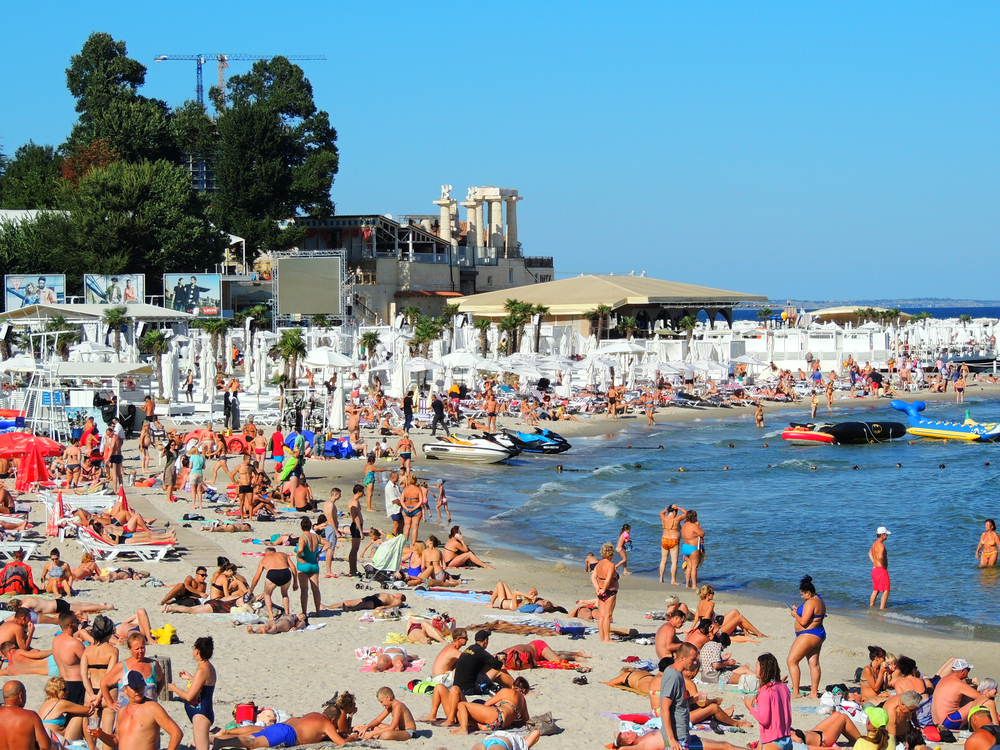
Arkadia Beach in Odesa

Deribasivska Street is one of the city's most important commercial streets, hosting many of the city's boutiques and higher-end shops. In addition to this there are a number of large commercial shopping centres in the city. The 19th-century shopping gallery Passage was, for a long time, the city's most upscale shopping district, and remains to this day an important landmark of Odesa.

The tourism sector is of great importance to Odesa, which is currently the second most-visited Ukrainian city. In 2003 this sector recorded a total revenue of ₴189.2 million. Other sectors of the city's economy include the banking sector: the city hosts a branch of the National Bank of Ukraine. Imexbank, one of Ukraine's largest commercial banks, was based in the city, however on 27 May 2015, the Deposit Guarantee Fund of Ukraine made a decision to liquidate the bank.

Foreign business ventures have thrived in the area, as since 1 January 2000, much of the city and its surrounding area has been declared a free economic zone – this has aided the foundation of foreign companies' and corporations' Ukrainian divisions and allowed them to more easily invest in the Ukrainian manufacturing and service sectors. To date a number of Japanese and Chinese companies, as well as a host of European enterprises, have invested in the development of the free economic zone, to this end private investors in the city have invested a great deal of money into the provision of quality office real estate and modern manufacturing facilities such as warehouses and plant complexes.

Odesa also has a well-developed IT industry with large number of IT outsourcing companies and IT product startups. Among most famous startups is Looksery and AI Factory both developed in Odesa and acquired by Snap Inc.

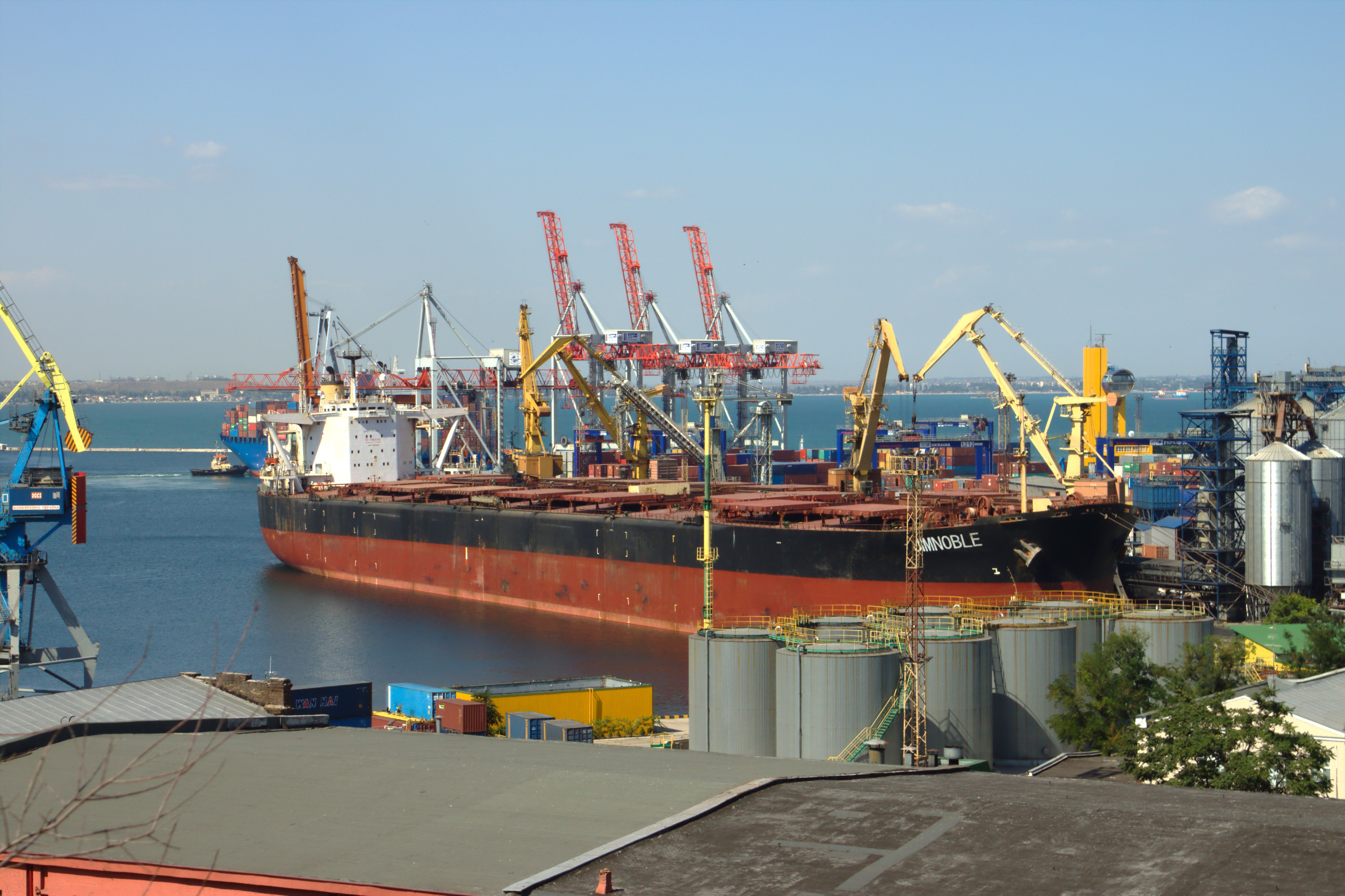
Odesa's port is Ukraine's busiest. The harbour remains accessible all year round and serves as a vital import/export channel for the Ukrainian economy.

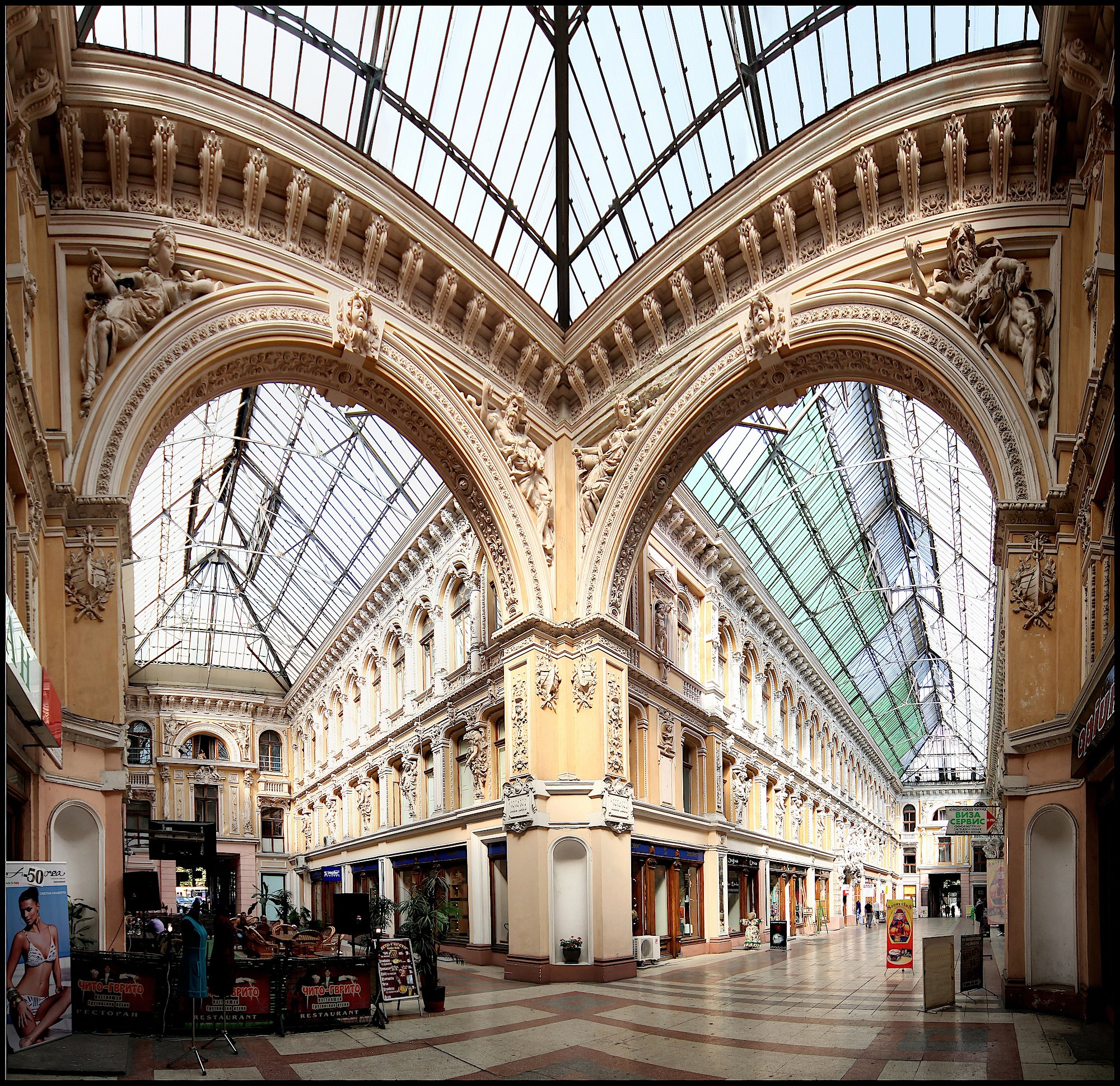
The Passage galleries, one of the city's landmarks

== Scientists ==
A number of scientists have lived and worked in Odesa. They include: Illya Mechnikov (Nobel Prize in Medicine 1908), Igor Tamm (Nobel Prize in Physics 1958), Selman Waksman (Nobel Prize in Medicine 1952), Dmitri Mendeleev, Nikolay Pirogov, Ivan Sechenov, Vladimir Filatov, Nikolay Umov, Leonid Mandelstam, Aleksandr Lyapunov, Mark Krein, Alexander Smakula, Waldemar Haffkine, Valentin Glushko, Israel Dostrovsky, Catherine Chamié, and George Gamow.

== Transport ==
=== Maritime transport ===
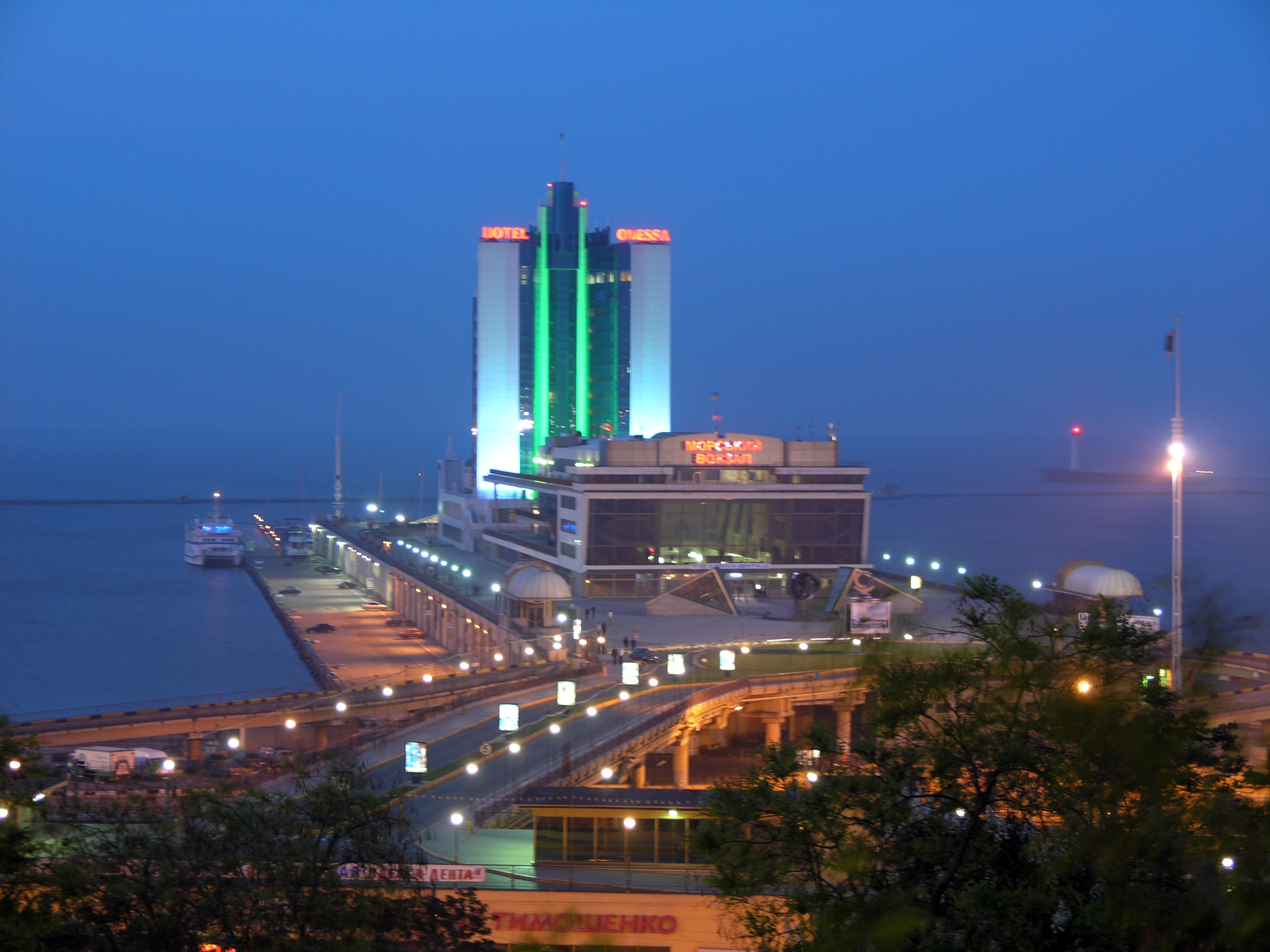
Odesa has long been an important Black Sea port.

Odesa is a major maritime-transport hub that includes several ports including Port of Odesa, Port of Chornomorsk (ferry, freight), Pivdennyi (freight only). The Port of Odesa became a provisional headquarters for the Ukrainian Navy, following the Russian occupation of Crimea in 2014. Before the fall of the Soviet Union, the Port of Odesa harbored the major Soviet cruise line Black Sea Shipping Company.

Passenger ships and ferries connect Odesa with Istanbul, Haifa and Varna, whilst river cruises can occasionally be booked for travel up the Dnieper River to cities such as Kherson, Dnipro and Kyiv.

=== Roads and automotive transport ===
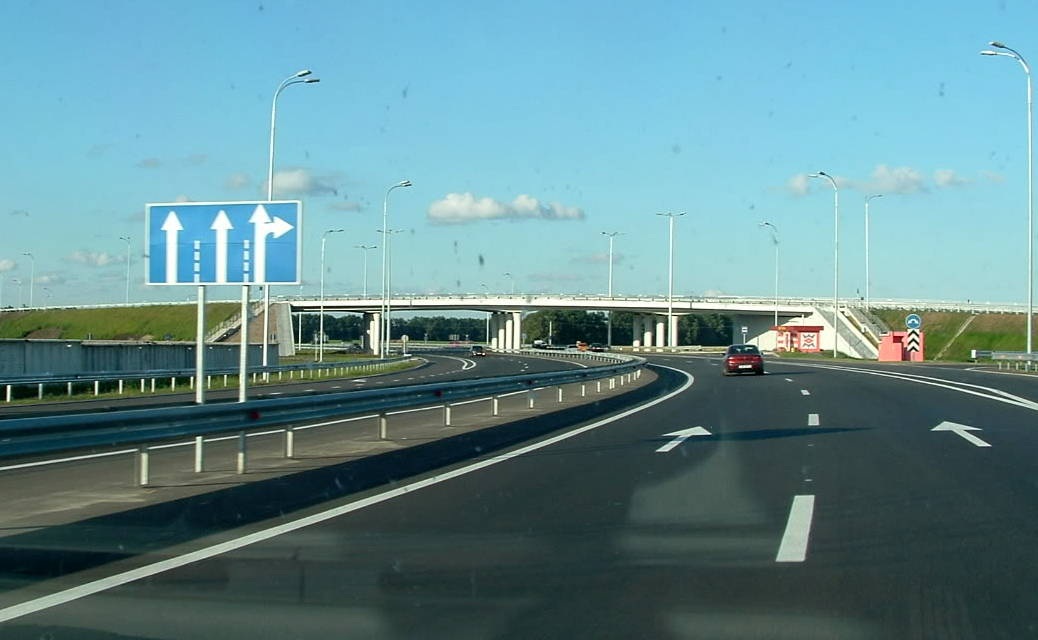
The M05 Highway links Odesa with the nation's capital, Kyiv. The Odesa junction.

The first car in the Russian Empire, a Mercedes-Benz belonging to V. Navrotsky, came to Odesa from France in 1891. He was a popular city publisher of the newspaper Odesskii listok ("Odesa leaf").

Odesa is linked to the Ukrainian capital, Kyiv, by the M05 Highway, a high quality multi-lane road which is set to be re-designated, after further reconstructive works, as an 'Avtomagistral' (motorway) in the near future. Other routes of national significance, passing through Odesa, include the M16 Highway to Moldova, M15 to Izmail and Romania, and the M14 which runs from Odesa, through Mykolaiv and Kherson to Ukraine's eastern border with Russia. The M14 is of particular importance to Odesa's maritime and shipbuilding industries as it links the city with Ukraine's other large deep water port Mariupol which is located in the south east of the country.

Odesa also has a well-developed system of inter-urban municipal roads and minor beltways. However, the city is still lacking an extra-urban bypass for transit traffic which does not wish to proceed through the city centre.

Intercity bus services are available from Odesa to many cities in Russia (Moscow, Rostov-on-Don, Krasnodar, Pyatigorsk), Germany (Berlin, Hamburg and Munich), Greece (Thessaloniki and Athens), Bulgaria (Varna and Sofia) and several cities of Ukraine and Europe.

=== Railways ===
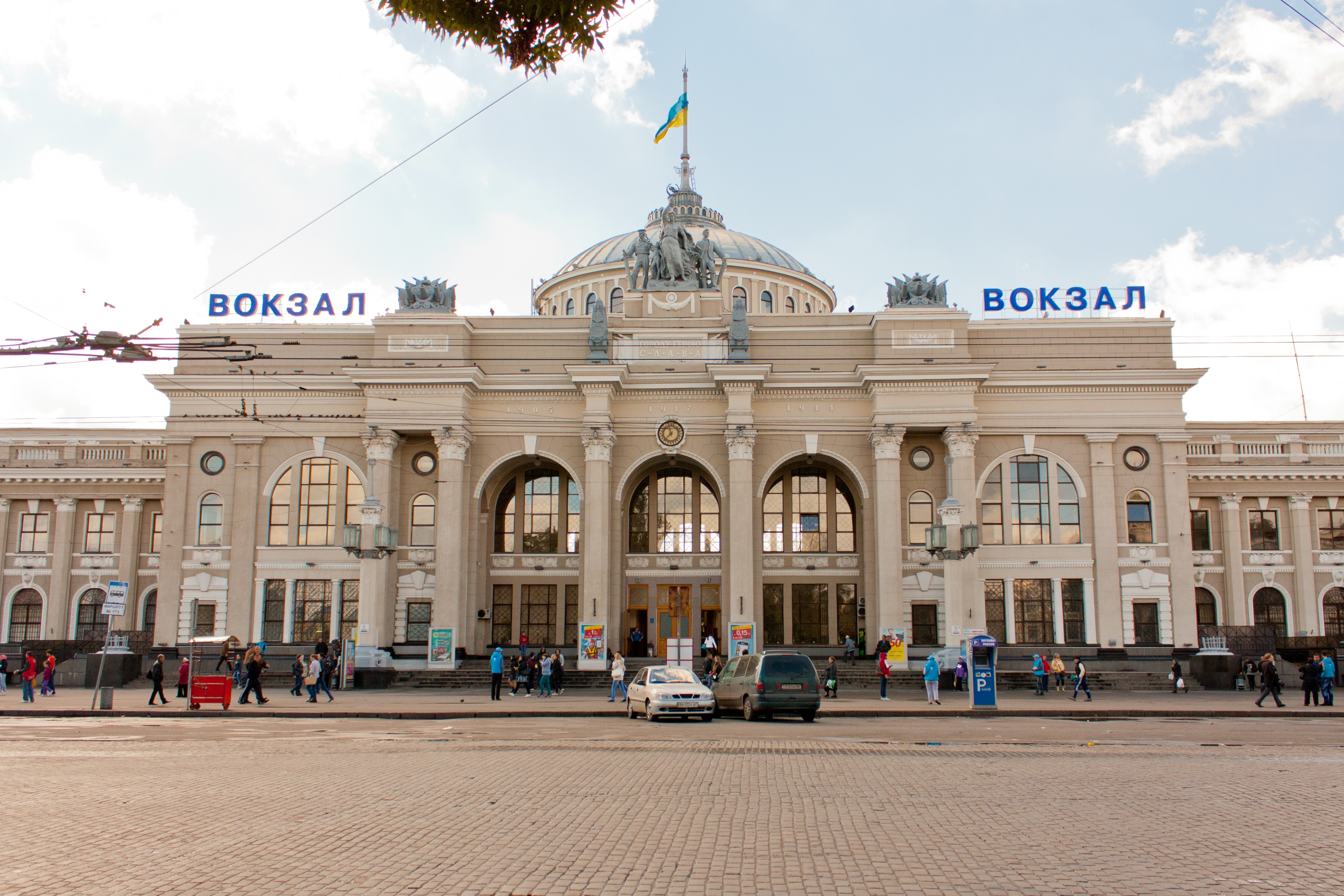
Odesa Holovna is one of Ukraine's largest railway terminals. Every day trains depart to many national and international destinations.

Odesa is served by a number of railway stations and halts, the largest of which is Odesa Holovna (Main Station). From this station services connect Odesa with Warsaw, Prague, Bratislava, Vienna, Berlin, Moscow, St. Petersburg, the cities of Ukraine and many other cities of the former USSR. The city's first railway station was opened in the 1880s. During the Second World War, the iconic building of the main station, which had long been considered to be one of the Russian Empire's premier stations, was destroyed through enemy action.

In 1952 the station was rebuilt to the designs of A Chuprina. The current station, which is characterised by its many socialist-realist architectural details and grand scale, was renovated by the state railway operator Ukrainian Railways in 2006.

=== Public transport ===
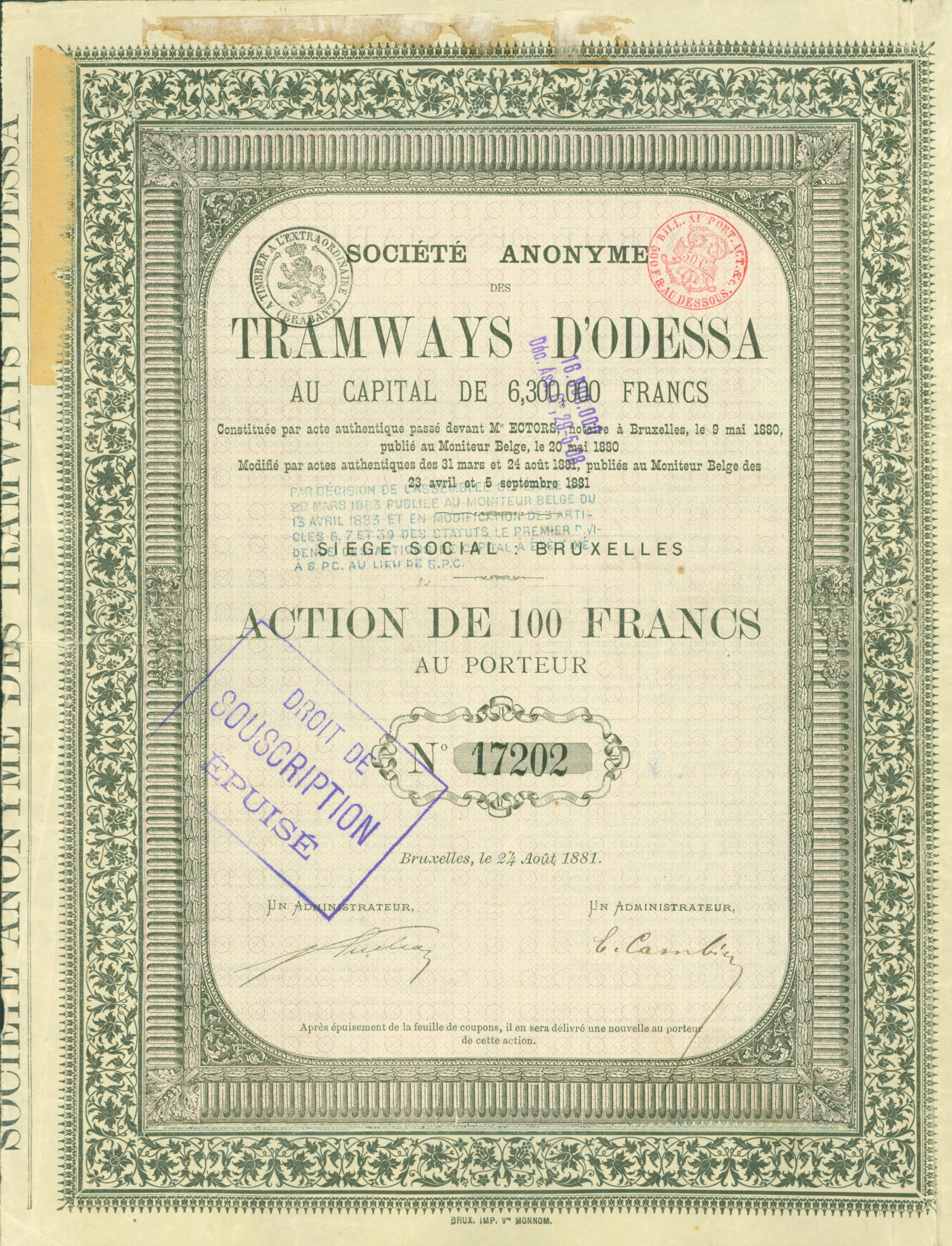
Share of the Belgian company "Tramways d'Odessa", issued 24 August 1881

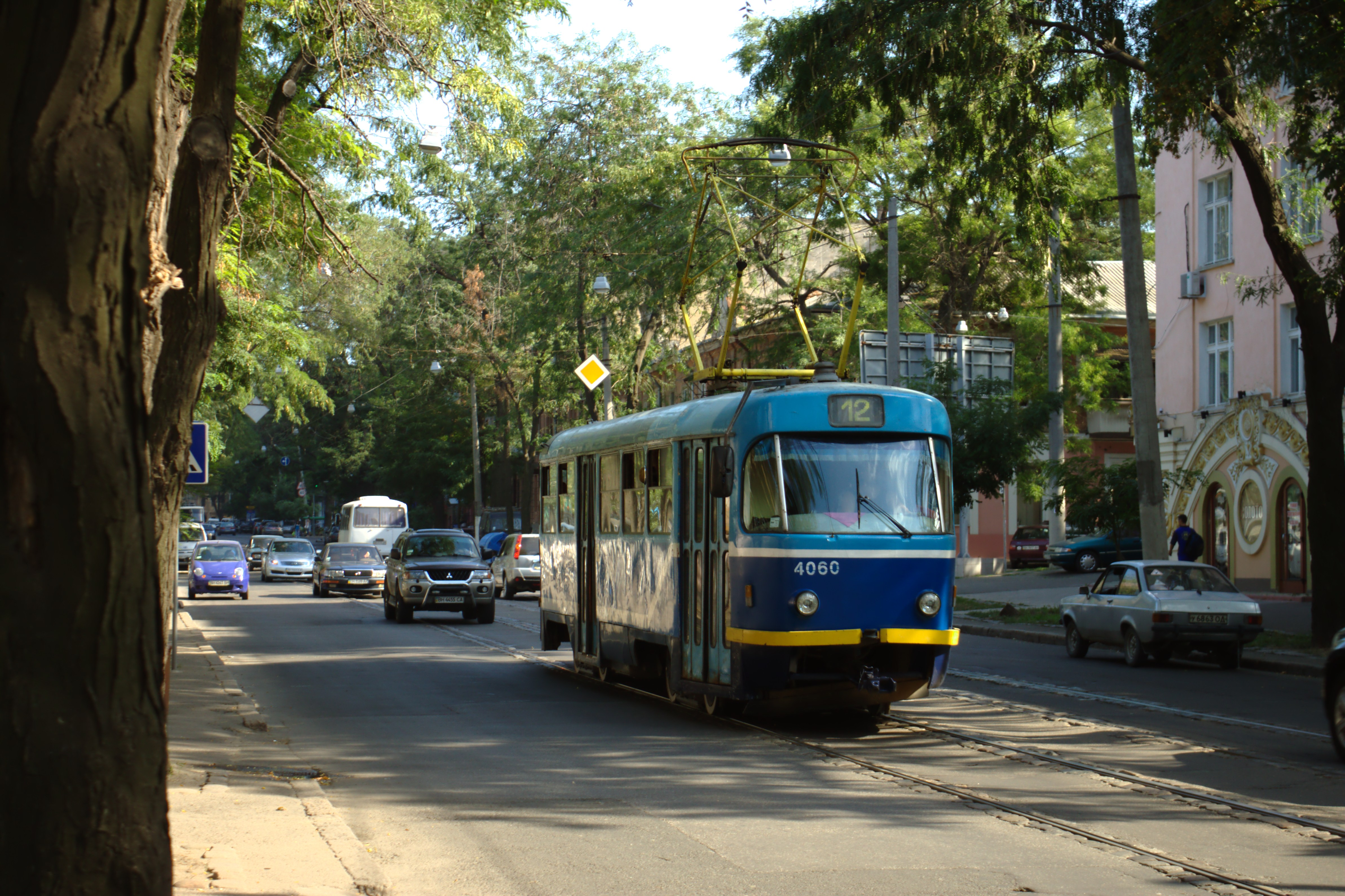
An Odesa tram on Sofievska Street

In 1881, Odesa became the first city in Imperial Russia to have steam tramway lines, an innovation that came only one year after the establishment of horse tramway services in 1880 operated by the "Tramways d'Odessa", a Belgian owned company. The first metre-gauge steam tramway line ran from Railway Station to Great Fontaine and the second one to Hadzhi Bey Liman. These routes were both operated by the same Belgian company. Electric tramway started to operate on 22 August 1907. Trams were imported from Germany.

The city's public transit system is currently made up of trams, trolleybuses, buses and fixed-route taxis (marshrutkas). Odesa also has a cable car to Vidrada Beach, and recreational ferry service. There are two routes of public transport which connect Odesa Airport with the city center: trolley-bus No.14 and marshrutka No.117.

One additional mode of transport in Odesa is the Potemkin Stairs funicular railway, which runs between the city's Primorsky Bulvar and the sea terminal, has been in service since 1902. In 1998, after many years of neglect, the city decided to raise funds for a replacement track and cars. This project was delayed on multiple occasions but was finally completed eight years later in 2005. The funicular has now become as much a part of historic Odesa as the staircase to which it runs parallel.

=== Air transport ===
Odesa International Airport, which is located to the south-west of the city centre, is served by a number of airlines. The airport is also often used by citizens of neighbouring countries for whom Odesa is the nearest large city and who can travel visa-free to Ukraine.

Transit flights from the Americas, Africa, Asia, Europe and the Middle East to Odesa are offered by Ukraine International Airlines through their hub at Kyiv's Boryspil International Airport.

== Sport ==
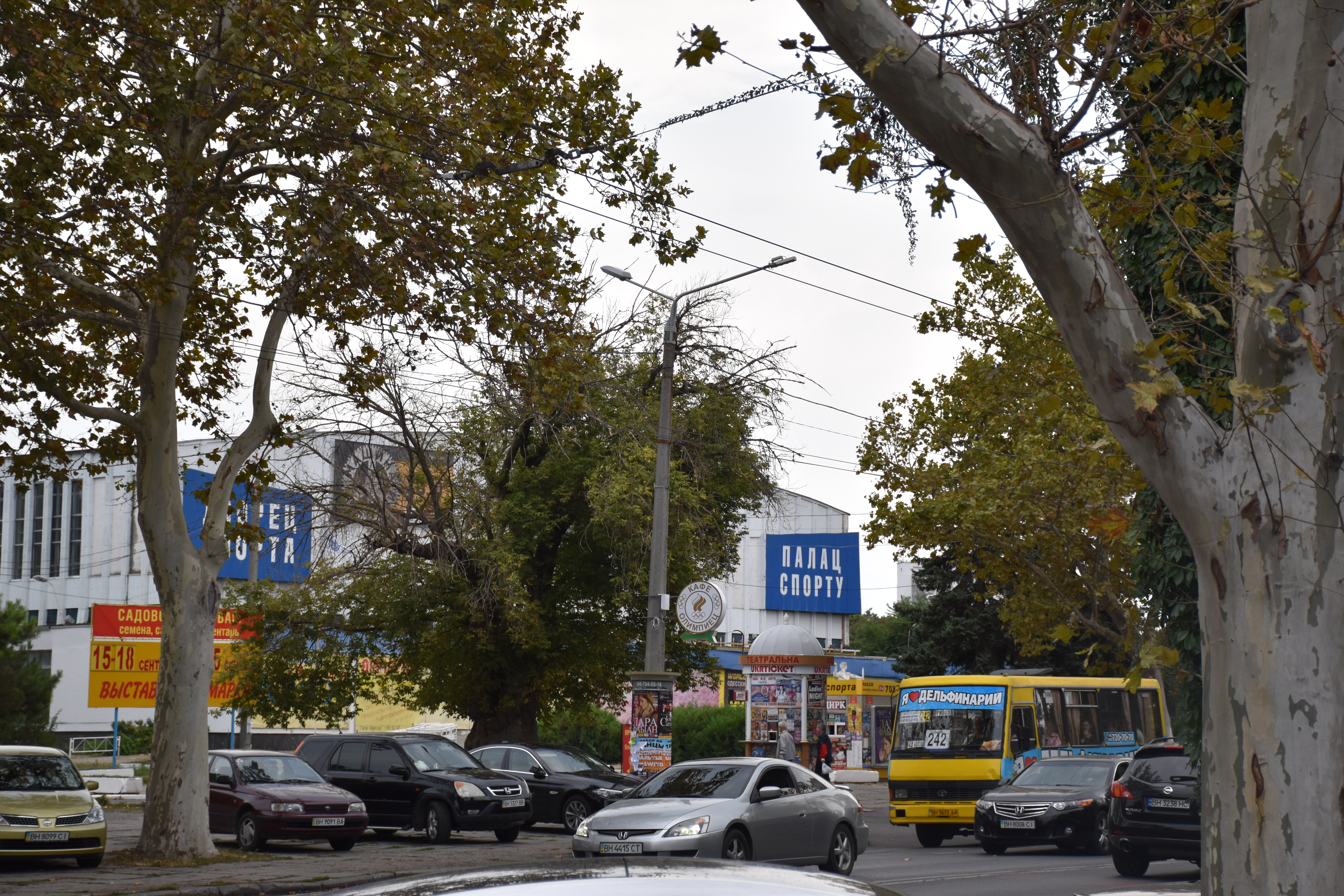
The Odesa Palace of Sports

The most popular sport in Odesa is football. The main professional football club in the city is FC Chornomorets Odesa, who play in the Ukrainian Premier League. Chornomorets play their home games at the Chornomorets Stadium, an elite-class stadium which has a maximum capacity of 34,164. The second football team in Odesa is FC Real Pharma Odesa, another team dissolved in 2013 was FC Odesa.

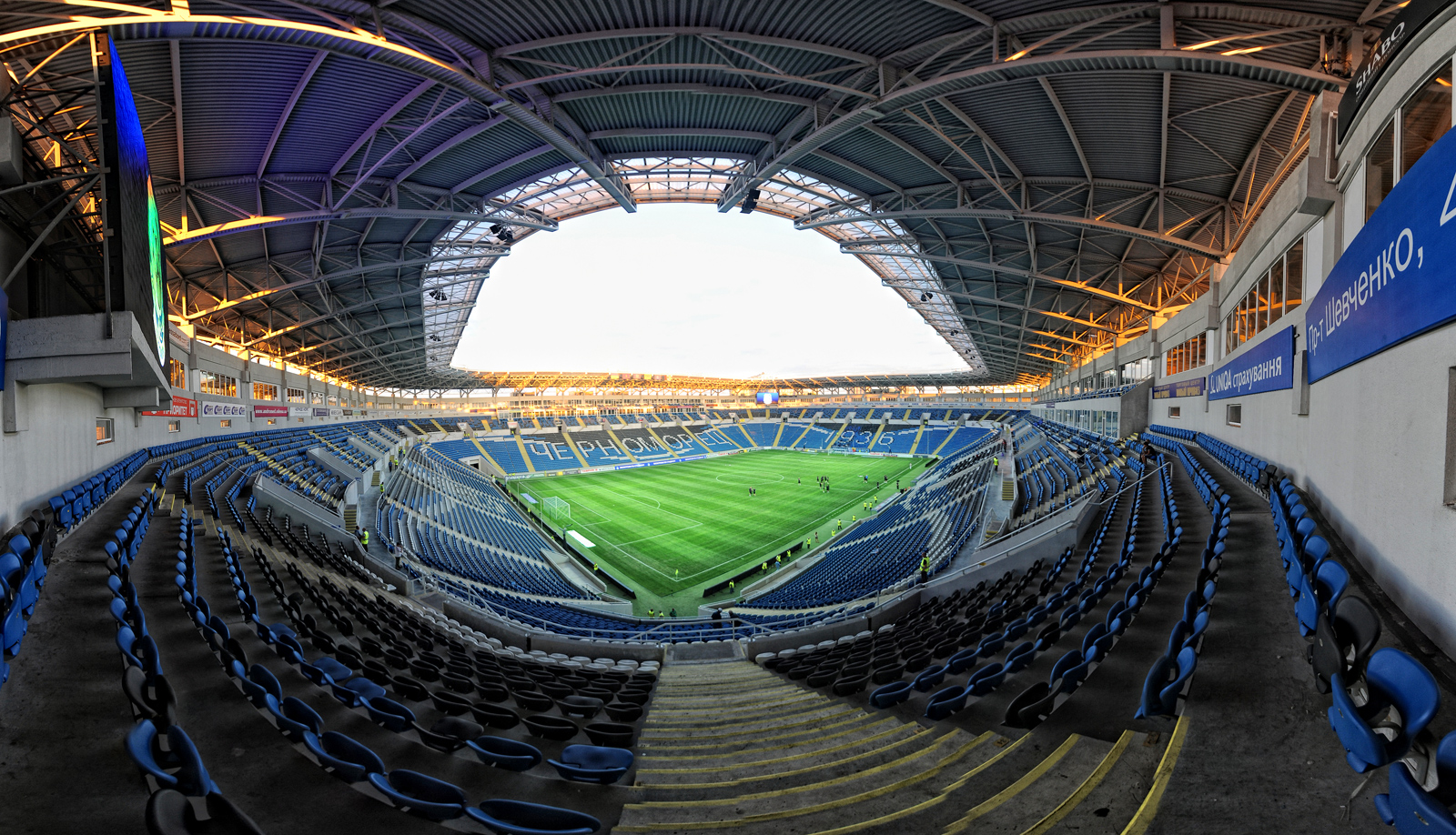
Chornomorets Stadium renovated in preparation for the Euro 2012

Basketball is also a prominent sport in Odesa, with BC Odesa representing the city in the Ukrainian Basketball League, the highest tier basketball league in Ukraine. Odesa will become one of five Ukrainian cities to host the 39th European Basketball Championship in 2015.

=== Athletes ===
The cyclist and aviator Sergei Utochkin was one of the most famous natives of Odesa in the years before the Russian Revolution. Chess player Efim Geller was born in the city. Gymnast Tatiana Gutsu (known as "The Painted Bird of Odesa") brought home Ukraine's first Olympic gold medal as an independent nation when she outscored the USA's Shannon Miller in the women's all-around event at 1992 Summer Olympics in Barcelona, Spain.

Figure skaters Oksana Grishuk and Evgeny Platov won the 1994 and 1998 Olympic gold medals as well as the 1994, 1995, 1996, and 1997 World Championships in ice dance. Both were born and raised in the city, though they skated at first for the Soviet Union, in the Unified Team, the Commonwealth of Independent States, and then Russia. Hennadiy Avdyeyenko won a 1988 Olympic gold medal in the high jump, setting an Olympic record at 2.38 metres (7.81 feet).

Other notable athletes:

- Mykola Avilov, Olympic champion in decathlon at the 1972 Summer Olympics in Munich
- Oksana Baiul, Olympic champion in figure skating in 1994
- Ihor Belanov, European Footballer of the Year in 1986
- Yuriy Bilonoh, European Athletics Championships in shot put at 2002 in Munich
- Leonid Buryak (born 1953), football coach and former Olympic bronze medal-winning player
- Maksim Chmerkovskiy, professional ballroom & Latin dancer on American Dancing With the Stars
- Valentin Chmerkovskiy, professional ballroom & Latin dancer on American Dancing With the Stars
- Charles Goldenberg (1911–1986), NFL All-Pro football player
- Viktor Kanevskyi (born 1936), football player and coach
- Svetlana Krachevskaya, Olympic silver medalist in shot put
- Viacheslav Kravtsov, NBA basketball player
- Lenny Krayzelburg (born 1975), Olympic champion swimmer
- Irina Krush (born 1983), US chess grandmaster
- Artur Kyshenko, K1 Muay Thai kickboxer
- Yevgeny Lapinsky, Olympic champion in volleyball at the 1968 Summer Olympics in Mexico
- Roman Pelts, Soviet chess master
- Viktor Petrenko, Olympic champion in figure skating in 1992
- Vladimir Portnoi, Olympic silver and bronze medalist in gymnastics
- Vitaliy Pushkar, racing driver, No. 6 in 2012 International Rally Challenge Production cup standings
- Theodore Rezvoy, ocean rower, Guinness records holder (twice)
- Ekaterina Rubleva, Russian ice dancing champion
- Yulia Ryabchinskaya, Olympic champion in the K-1 500 m Kayak Singles at the 1972 Summer Olympics in Munich
- Dmitry Salita (born 1982), boxer
- Michael Shmerkin (born 1970), Israeli competitive figure skater
- Elina Svitolina (born 1994), professional tennis player
- Olena Vitrychenko, world champion in rhythmic gymnastics
- Andriy Voronin (born 1979), football manager and player
- Yakov Zheleznyak, Olympic champion in 50 m Running Target at the 1972 Summer Olympics in Munich
- Dayana Yastremska (born 2000), professional tennis player

== Twin towns – sister cities ==
Odesa is twinned with:

- Alexandria, Egypt (1968)
- Baltimore, United States (1975)
- Bremen, Germany (2023)
- Chișinău, Moldova (1994)
- Constanța, Romania (1991)
- Genoa, Italy (1972)
- Haifa, Israel (1992)
- Istanbul, Turkey (1997)
- Kolkata, India (1986)
- Liverpool, United Kingdom (1957)
- Łódź, Poland (1993)
- Marseille, France (1973)
- Nicosia, Cyprus (1996)
- Nova Odessa, Brazil (2025)
- Oulu, Finland (1957)
- Piraeus, Greece (1993)
- Qingdao, China (1993)
- Regensburg, Germany (1990)
- Split, Croatia (1964)
- Szeged, Hungary (1977)
- Vancouver, Canada (1944)
- Varna, Bulgaria (1958)
- Yerevan, Armenia (1995)
- Yokohama, Japan (1968)

=== Partner cities ===
Odesa cooperated with:

- Brest, Belarus (2004)
- Gdańsk, Poland (1996)
- Klaipėda, Lithuania (2004)
- Larnaca, Cyprus (2004)
- Marrakesh, Morocco (2019)
- Minsk, Belarus (1996)
- Ningbo, China (2008)
- Tallinn, Estonia (1997)
- (Georgia (country)) Tbilisi, Georgia (1996)
- Valparaíso, Chile (2004)
- Vienna, Austria (2006)
- Warsaw, Poland (2005)

== See also ==
- Kherson Governorate
- List of UNESCO World Heritage Sites in Ukraine
- The Municipal Guard

== Cited sources ==
- Richardson, Tanya (2008). Kaleidoscopic Odessa: History and Place in Contemporary Ukraine. University of Toronto Press. ISBN 978-0-8020-9563-3.
- Imperial, Odesa Society of History and Artifacts (1848). Notes of the Imperial Odesa Society of History and Artifacts. Vol.2. Odesa: Odesa City Typography.
- Yefimenko, Aleksandra (2018). History of Ukraine and its people (История Украйны и ее народа). Litres. ISBN 9785457887299.
