= Odesa Funicular =

Double inclined lift in Ukraine

Odesa Funicular (Одеський фунікулер)
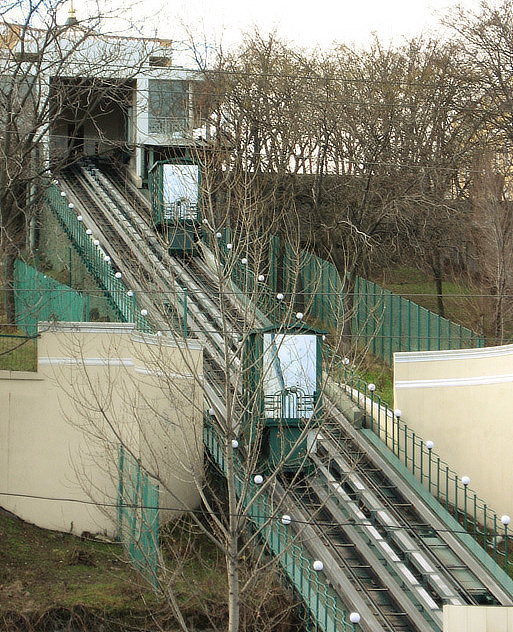

Overview
- Locale: Odesa, Ukraine
- Coordinates: 46°29′18.2″N 30°44′31.9″E
- Termini: Morskyi Port (lower station); Prymorskyi (upper station)
- Stations: 2

Service
- Type: Inclined lift

History
- Opened: 1902

Technical
- Line length: 130 metres (430 ft)
- Track gauge: 1,000 mm (3 ft 3 3/8 in)

The Odesa Funicular (Ukrainian: Одеський фунікулер, romanized: Odeskyi funikuler) serves the Ukrainian city of Odesa. Running alongside the Potemkin Stairs, it connects the Prymorskyi Boulevard with the Port of Odesa.

Despite what its name suggests, in its modern state the Odesa Funicular is not technically a funicular but rather a double inclined lift.

== History ==
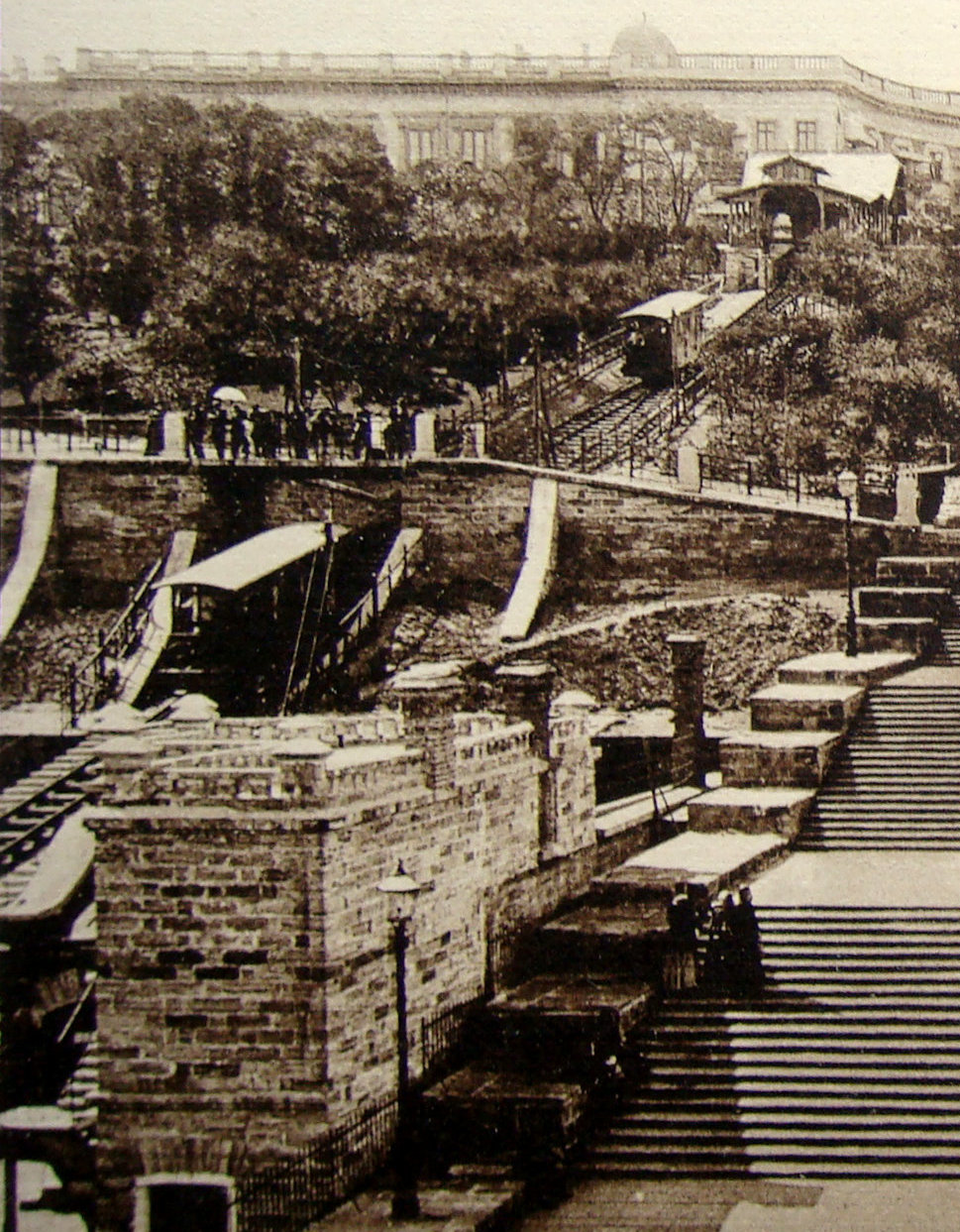
Odesa Funicular, circa early 20th century

The funicular was designed by the engineer N. I. Pyatnitsky and opened on 8 June 1902. It was equipped with two passenger cabins for 35 persons each delivered from Paris.

In 1969 the original system was replaced by a cascade of escalators, which had to be closed in 1997.

Then in 1998 the city council decided to restore the service, this time in the form of an inclined elevator. Construction started in the same year but was delayed until 2005, and the ropeway was reopened on 2 September 2005.

Service was interrupted for much of 2016 for repairs to the Potemkin Stairs.

== Route ==
Located in the old town, the central city district, the line starts at the Primorsky Boulevard (Primorsky Bulvar), in which lies the upper station, close to the Opera Theater. The line and ends at Prymorska Street (Prymorska vulytsia), by the Black Sea coastline. The lower station, Morsky Port, is in front of the city port and is next to the port's railway station.

Originally built with a single track and a passing loop in the middle, it now has two metre gauge tracks and runs for 130 metres (430 ft) alongside the Potemkin Stairs and Stambulsky Park. Each car has capacity for 12 passengers and the journey takes 3.5 minutes.

== Gallery ==
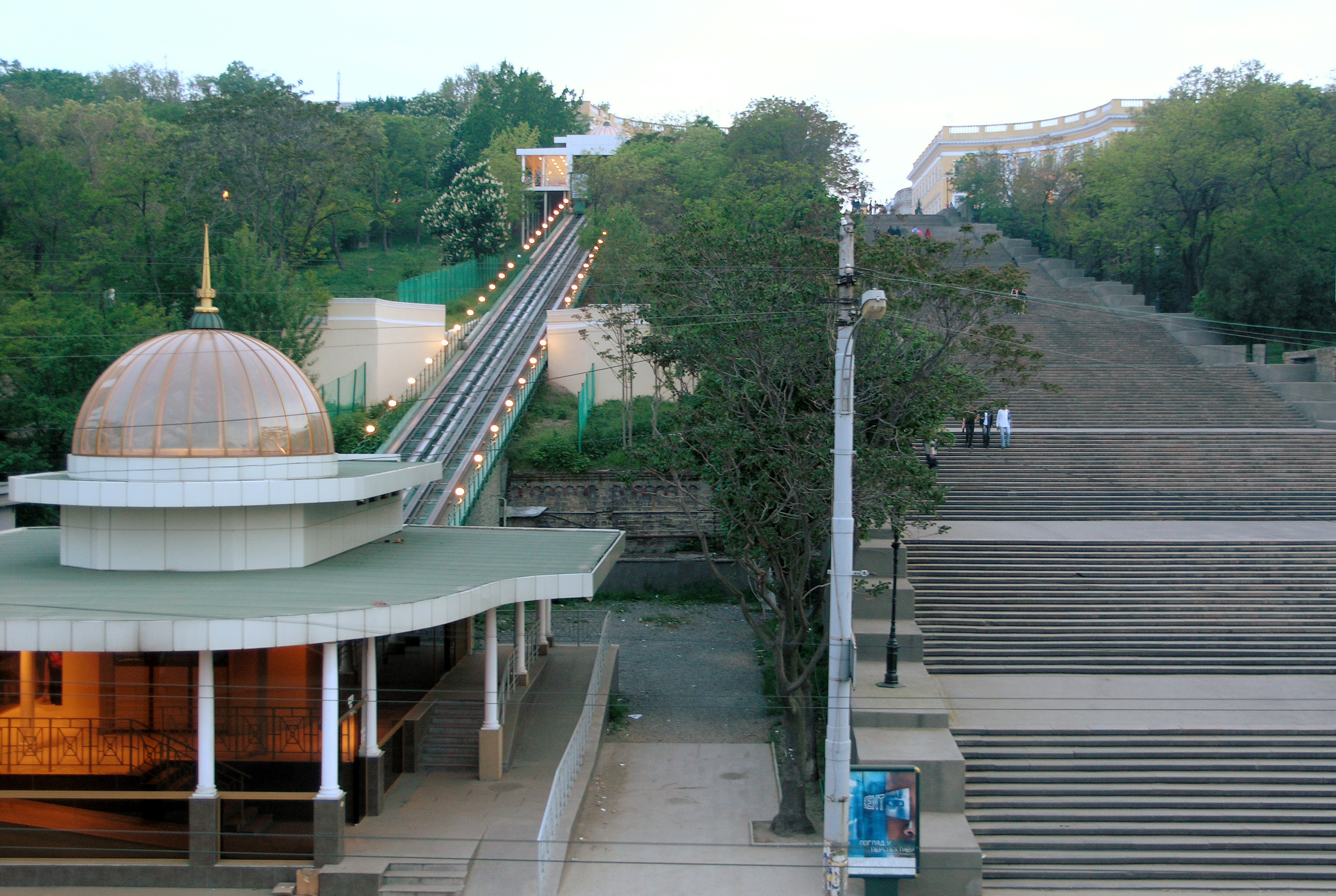
The lower station and the Potemkin Stairs

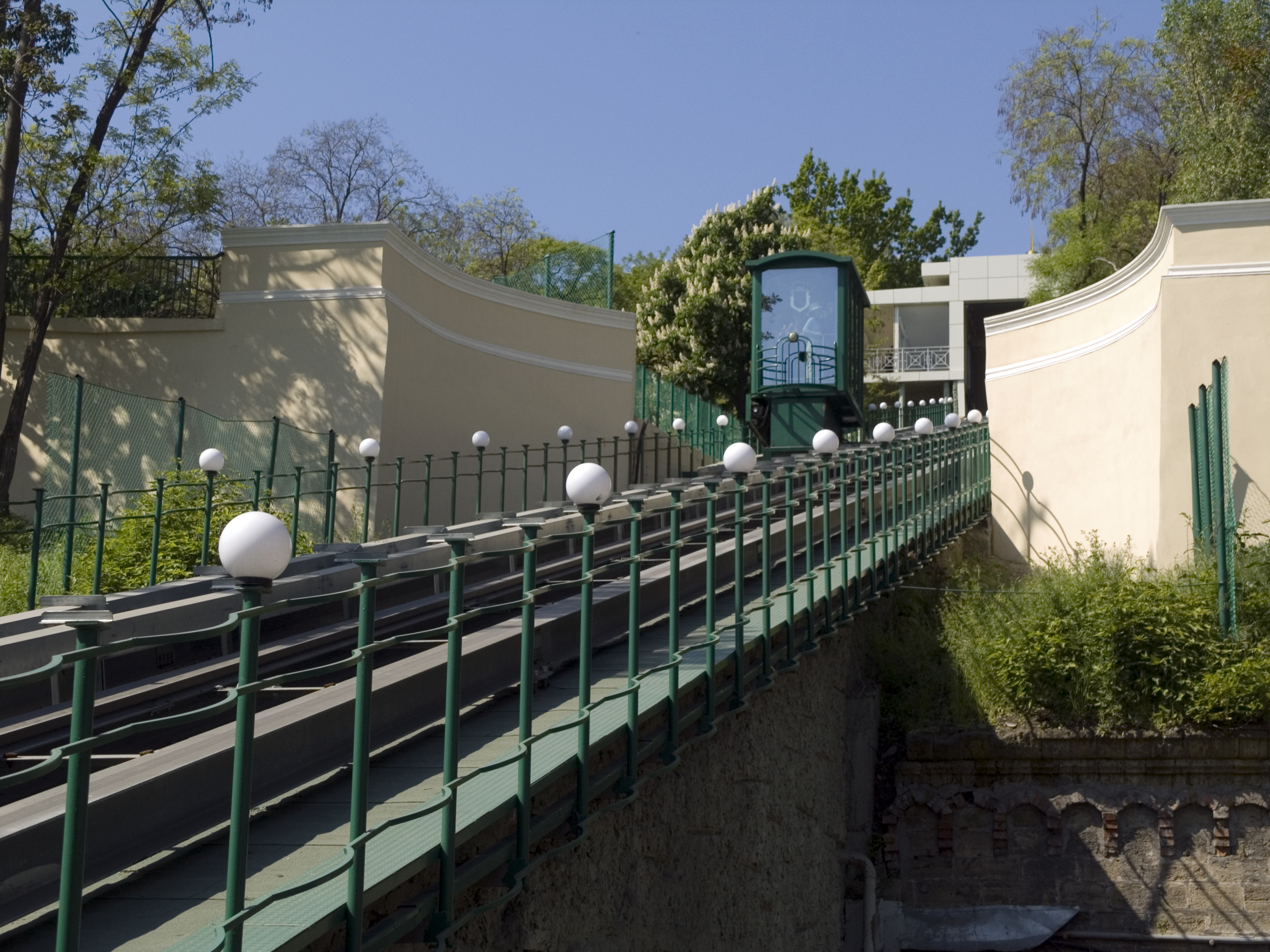
The upper station

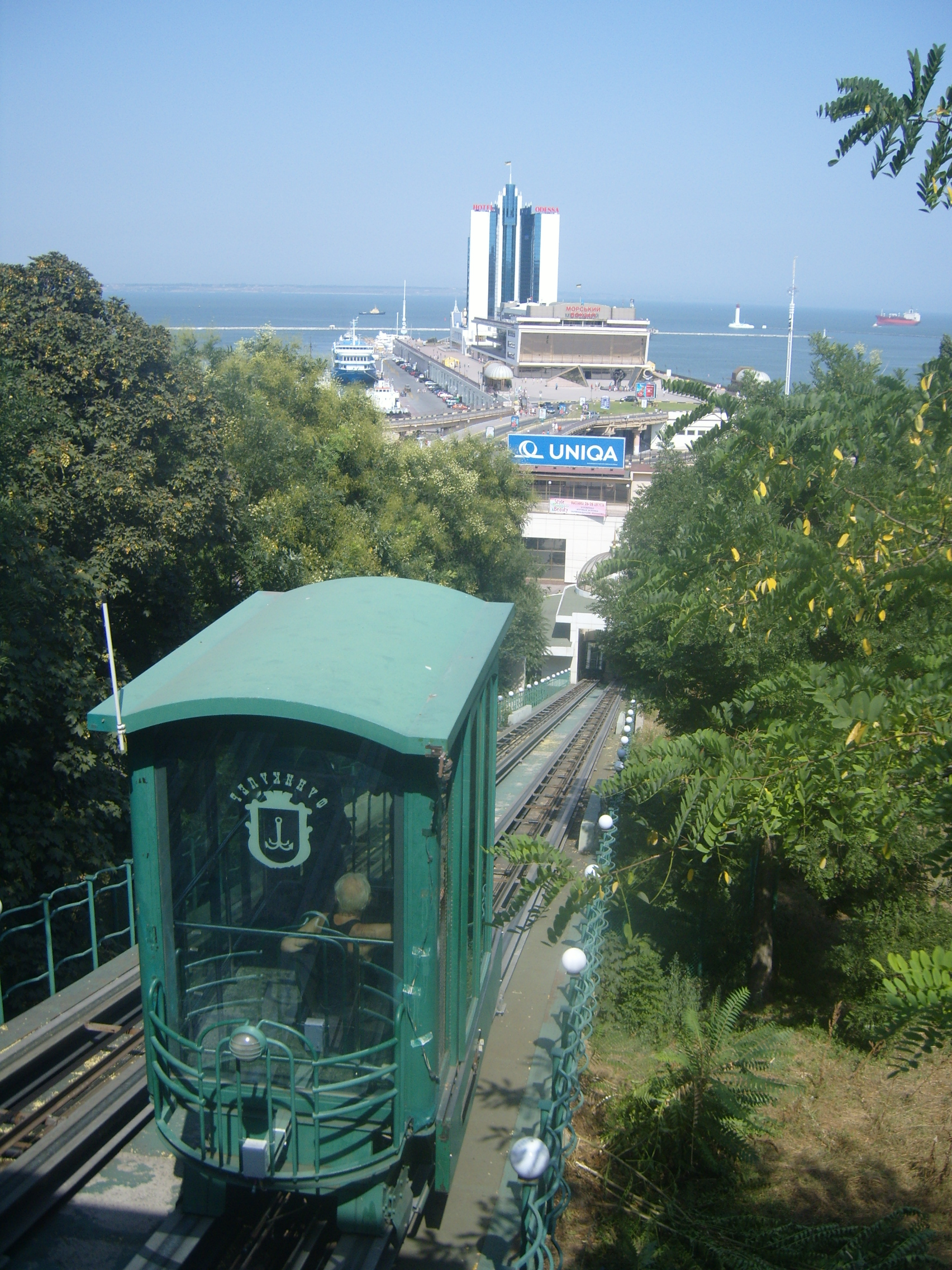
The port seen from the funicular

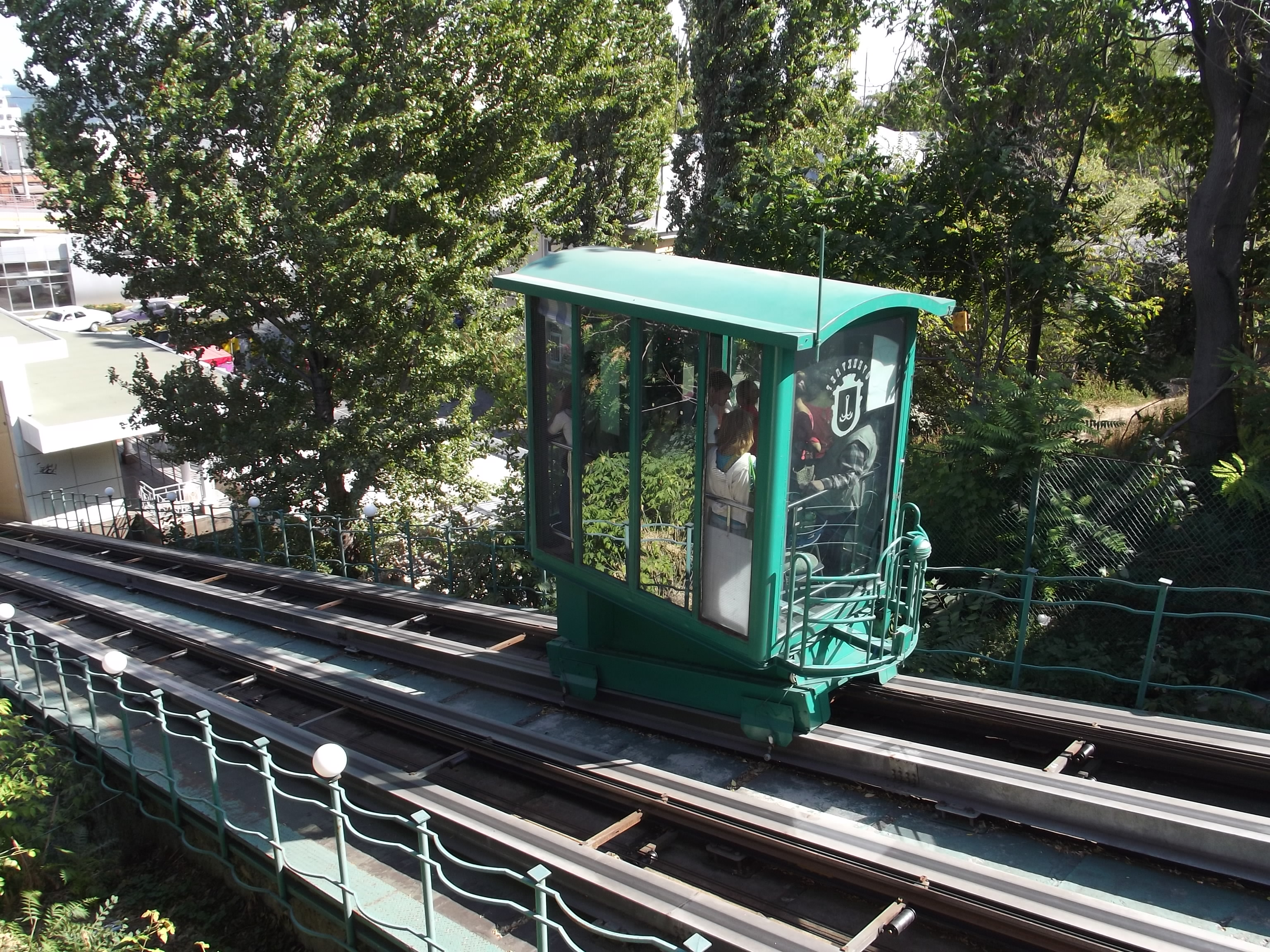
View of a car

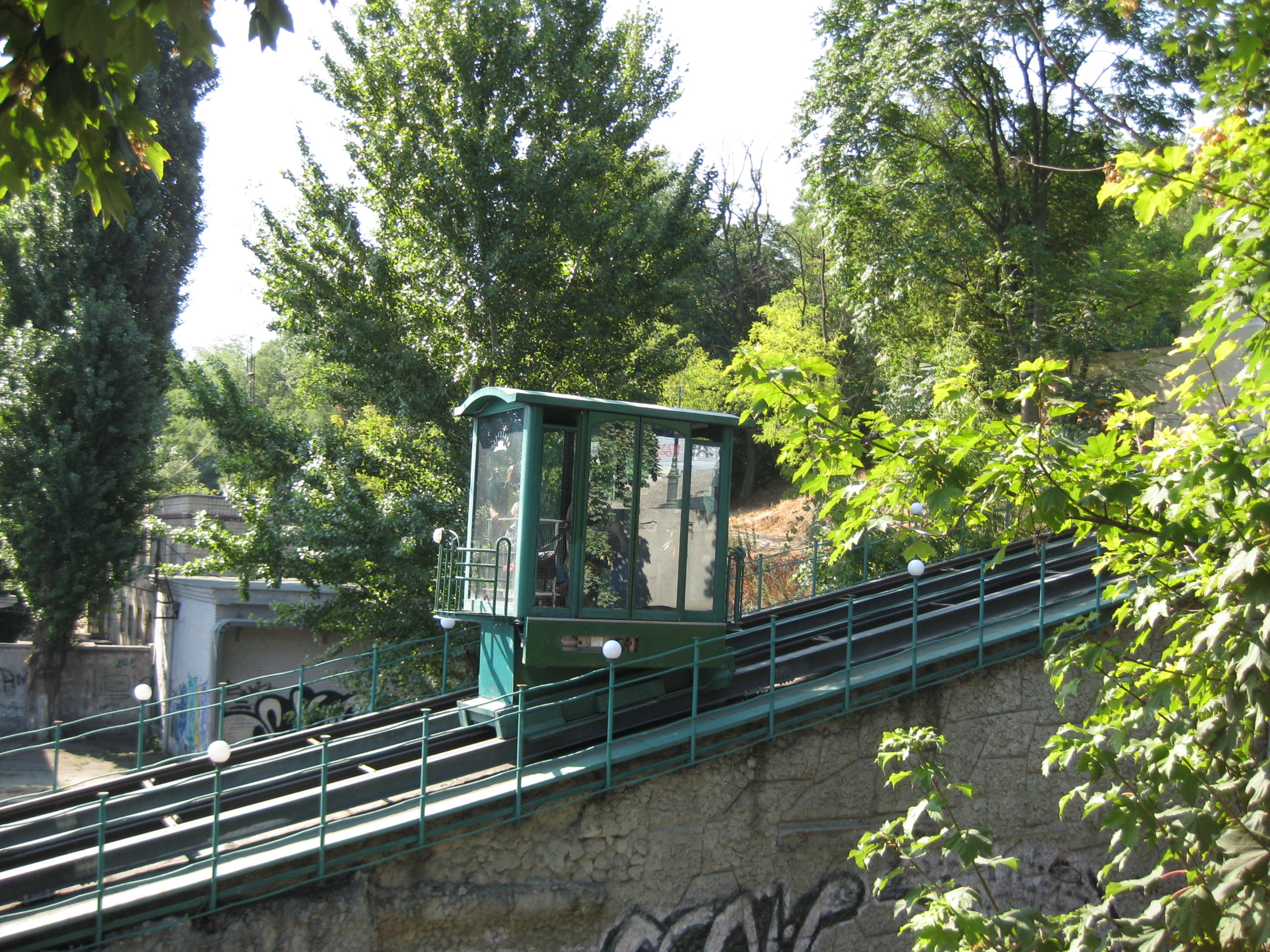
View of a car

== Literature ==
- Nicolas Iljine, Bel Kaufman, Oleg Gubar: Odesa Memories. University of Washington Press, Seattle, 2004 - ISBN 0-295-98345-0

== See also ==
- Kyiv Funicular
- Trams in Odesa
