= Vorontsov Palace (Odesa) =

Palace in Odesa, Ukraine

- Воронцовський палац
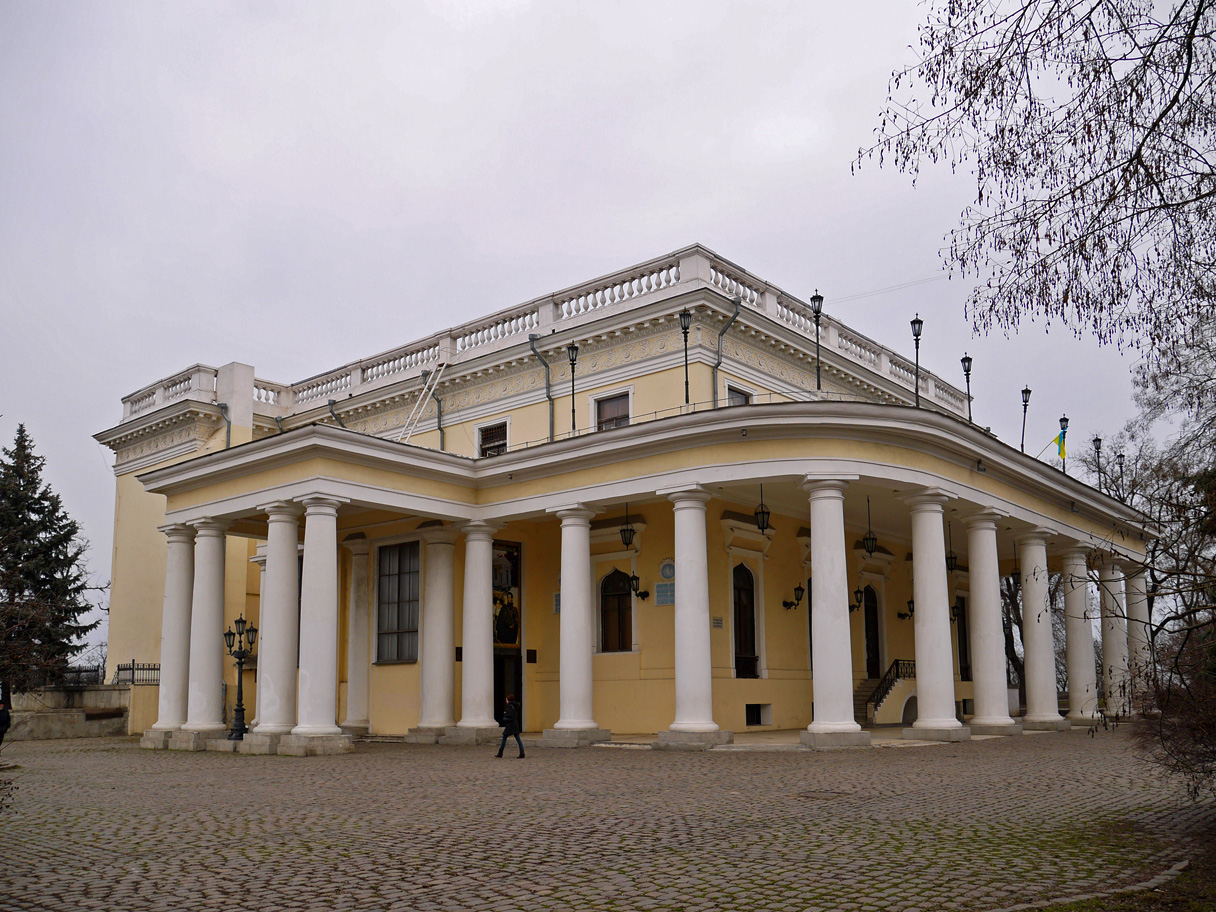
- Interactive map of the Vorontsov Palace area

General information
- Location: Odesa, Ukraine
- Coordinates: 46.49014°N 30.73882°E

Height
- Architectural: Francesco Boffo

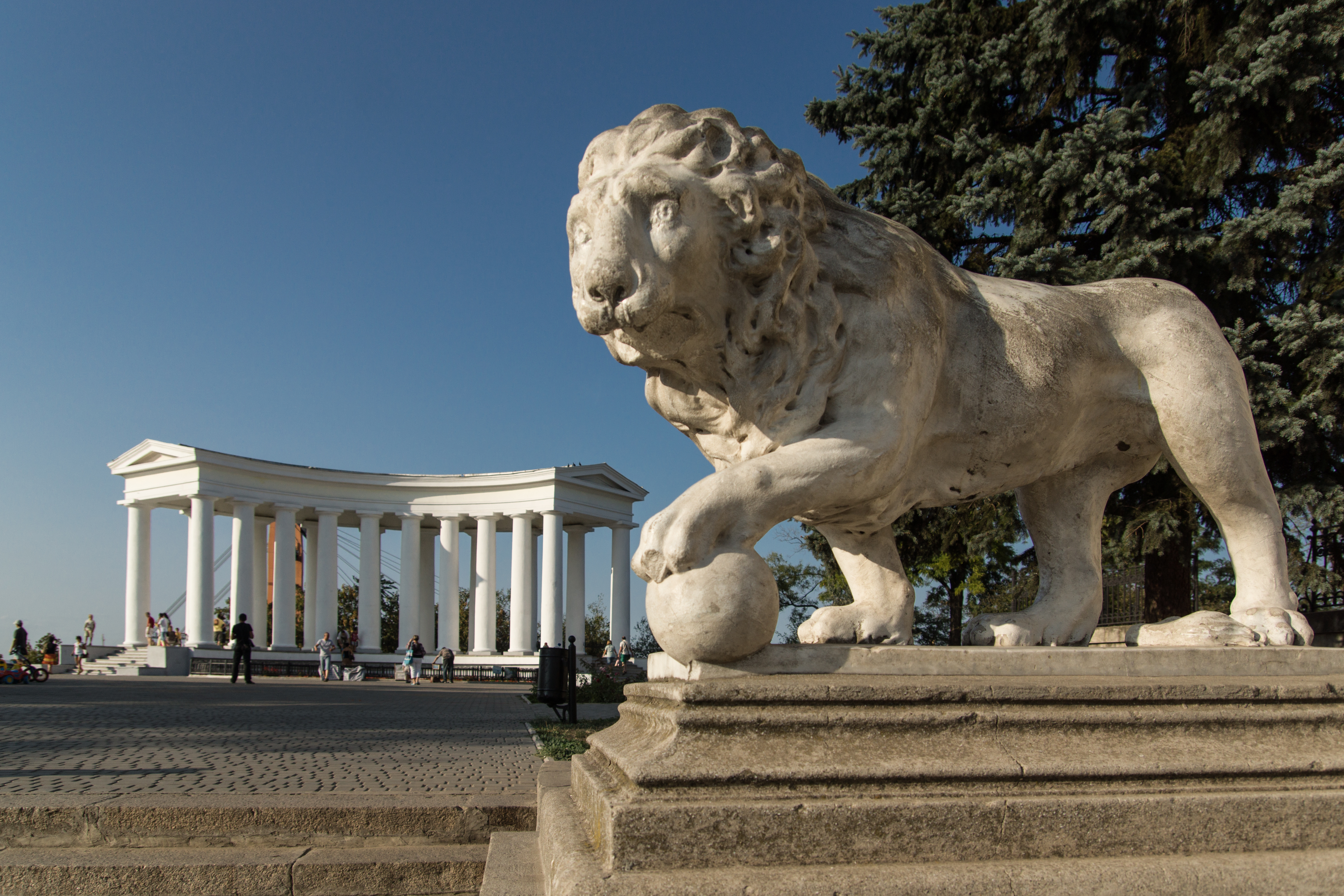
The colonnade and one of its Medici Lions.

The Vorontsov Palace (Ukrainian: Воронцовський палац; Russian: Воронцовский дворец) is a 19th-century palace and colonnade in Odesa, Ukraine, at the end of the Prymorskyi Boulevard pedestrian walkway.

== History ==
The buildings were built between 1827 and 1830 by the Sardinian-born architect Francesco Boffo for Russian Prince Mikhail Semyonovich Vorontsov, one of the governor-generals of Novorossiya. The palace was built on the site where the Turkish fortress of Khadjibey used to be. Palace complex includes main building, stables, colonnade and two lions, which used to stay near the gate of a main entrance. Vorontsov was so impressed with Boffo's work, that he contracted Boffo to design the Potemkin Stairs.

In 1906 it became an engineering school. During this time, next to the former palace was Lloyd's Travel Agency where the city's elite could purchase tickets for their trips abroad.

In 1917 it was the headquarters of the Soviet Red Guards, and in March 1917 the first Soviet of Workers' and Sailors' Deputies met in the building.

In 1936 the Vorontsov Palace was acquired by the Young Pioneers, and renamed the Children's Palace.

The present day palace is only the front part of the original structure, the less valuable part of the complex, the Orlov wing was torn down. The Orlov wing was mainly apartments and outbuildings—nicknamed the "Orlovsky outhouse", it stretched from today's Mother-in-Law's Bridge.

In the second half of the 20th century, the palace had two fires.

In 1994 sculptor Mikhail Reva built a fountain called "Day and Night" in the courtyard. The fountain has not had any water since 1999.
