= Historic Centre of Odesa =

UNESCO World Heritage Site in Odesa, Ukraine

- Історичний центр Одеси
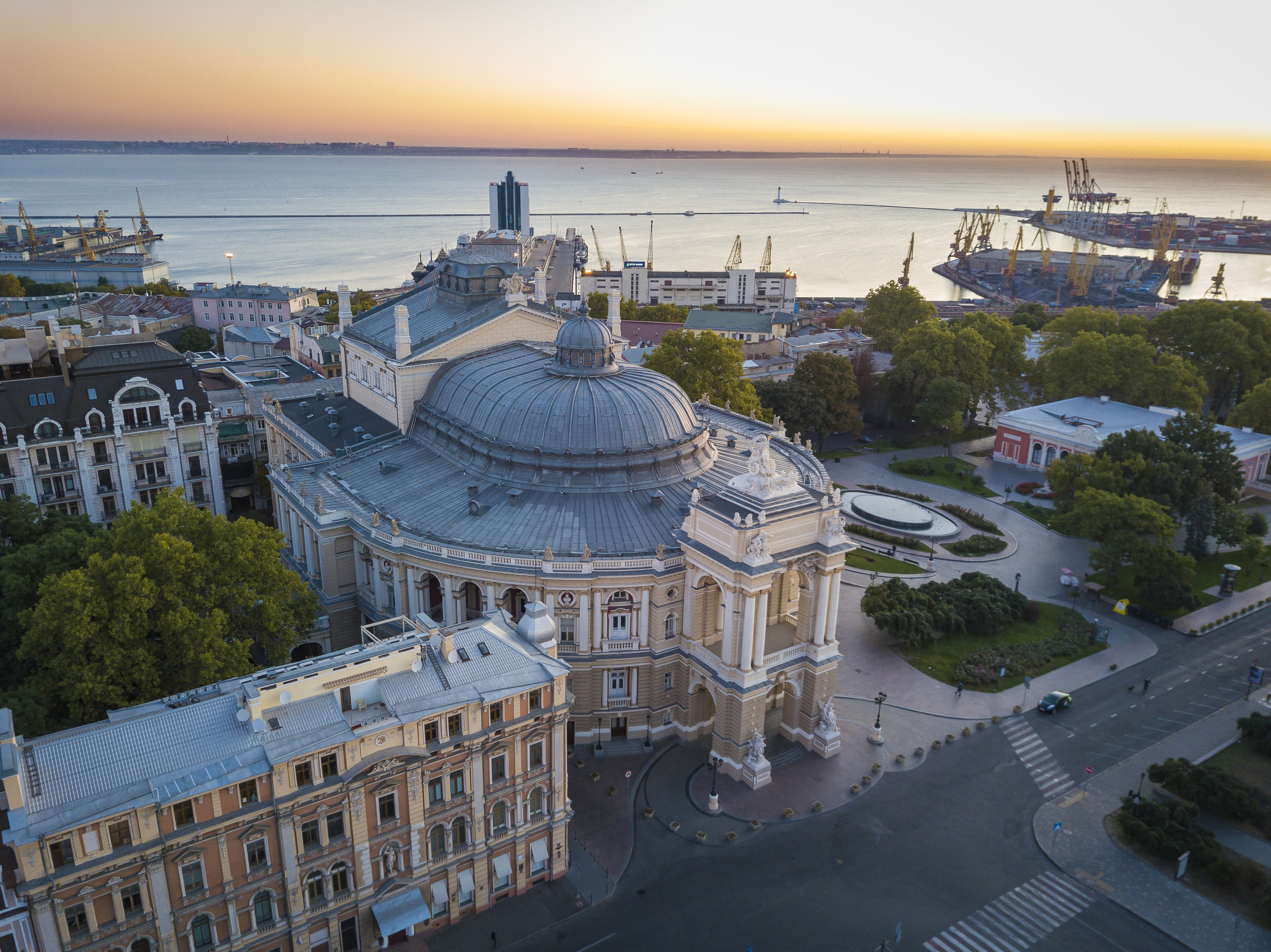

- Location within Ukraine

General information
- Location: Odesa, Ukraine
- Coordinates: 46°29′6″N 30°44′28″E

UNESCO World Heritage Site
- Official name: Historic Centre of Odesa
- Criteria: cultural: ii, iv
- Reference: 1703
- Inscription: 2023 (45th Session)
- Endangered: 2023–present

The Historic Centre of Odesa (Ukrainian: Історичний центр Одеси, romanized: Istorychnyi tsentr Odesy), Historical City Centre of Odesa, or Centre of Odesa is a city centre and World Heritage Site in Odesa, Ukraine. It was listed in 2023, and currently, it is on the list of World Heritage Sites in Danger because of the Russo-Ukrainian war.

== Selection ==
The site had been on the UNESCO tentative list since 6 January 2009. It was submitted by the Ukrainian Ministry of Culture and Tourism, and was assigned criteria i, ii, iii, iv and v. Under an emergency procedure in January 2023, UNESCO added it to both the World Heritage List and the List of World Heritage in Danger under criteria ii and iv.

== Description ==
The historic centre stands on a shallow indentation of the seacoast about 30 kilometres north of the Dniester estuary. The city was founded in 1794 by a strategic decision by Catherine the Great to build a warm-water port following the conclusion of the Russo-Turkish war of 1787–1792. The new city, built on the site of a Turkish fortress, was initially planned by a military engineer and then expanded further during the 19th century.

Odesa owes its character and rapid development during the 19th century to the success of its port, the favourable policies of its governors, and its status as a free port city from 1819 to 1859. Trade attracted many diverse people who formed multi-ethnic and multicultural communities, making Odesa a cosmopolitan city. Its pace of development, the wealth it generated and its multiculturalism all influenced its architectural expression and the variety of styles that still remain in the urban landscape. It has also caused tensions that, beginning in 1821, triggered a series of violent events. The historic centre of Odesa is a grid system of spacious tree-lined streets divided into two rectangular blocks, the direction of which conformed to the orientation of two deep ravines cutting through the Odesa high plateau perpendicular to the sea.

The city is characterised by relatively low-rise buildings. Designed by renowned architects and engineers, many from Italy in the early years, its theatres, religious buildings, schools, private palaces and tenement houses, clubs, hotels, banks, shopping centres, warehouses, stock exchanges, terminals and other public and administrative buildings represent both eclectic diversity in architectural styles and all the main activities of a trading city. Prymorskyi Boulevard, stretching along the edge of the plateau, Prymorskyi Stairs coming down to the shore, and the ensemble of the Odesa Opera and Ballet Theatre, and the Palais-Royal are the main landmarks of the city. While the urban planning and architectural quality represented in Odesa can also be found in other cities in the former Russian and Austro-Hungarian empires, Odesa has preserved large areas of its historic fabric that reflect its rapid and prosperous development in the 19th century and its population which was far more diverse than in many other cities. Thus, Odesa, through its urban planning and built heritage as a reflection of many cultures, values, customs, social structures, and denominations, can be considered to stand out as a testimony to multicultural and multi-ethnic traditions of Eastern European cities of the 19th century.

== Damage during the Russian invasion of Ukraine ==
On July 23, 2023 Russia launched an overnight missile attack on Odesa, which severely damaged the Orthodox Transfiguration Cathedral, the city's largest. Russia denied targeting the cathedral. Altogether, 25 architectural monuments were damaged in the historic Centre of Odesa according to authorities.

On November 5, 2023 a new Russian missile strike damaged Odesa Fine Arts Museum and several houses.

== Sites ==
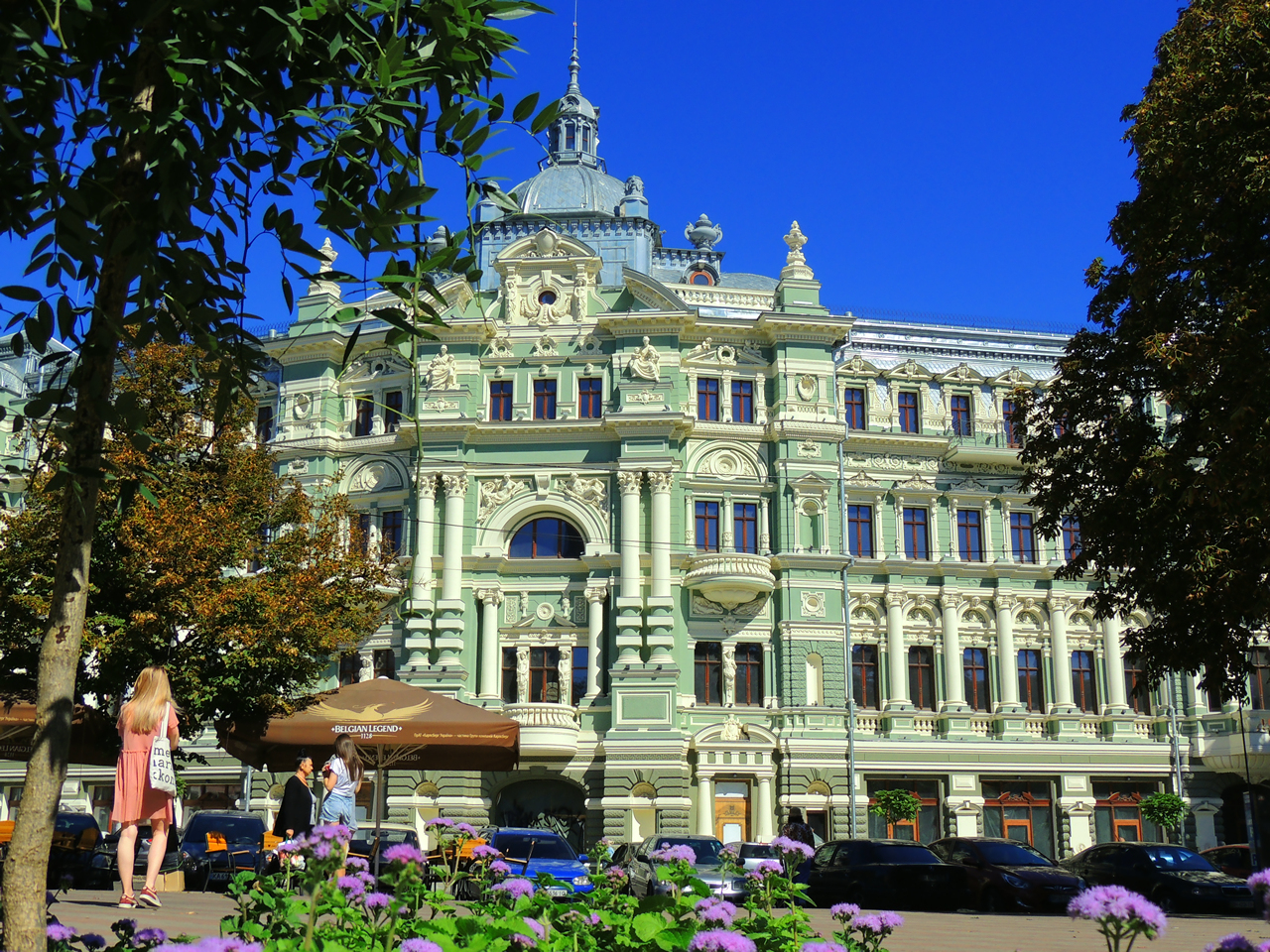
The Russov House

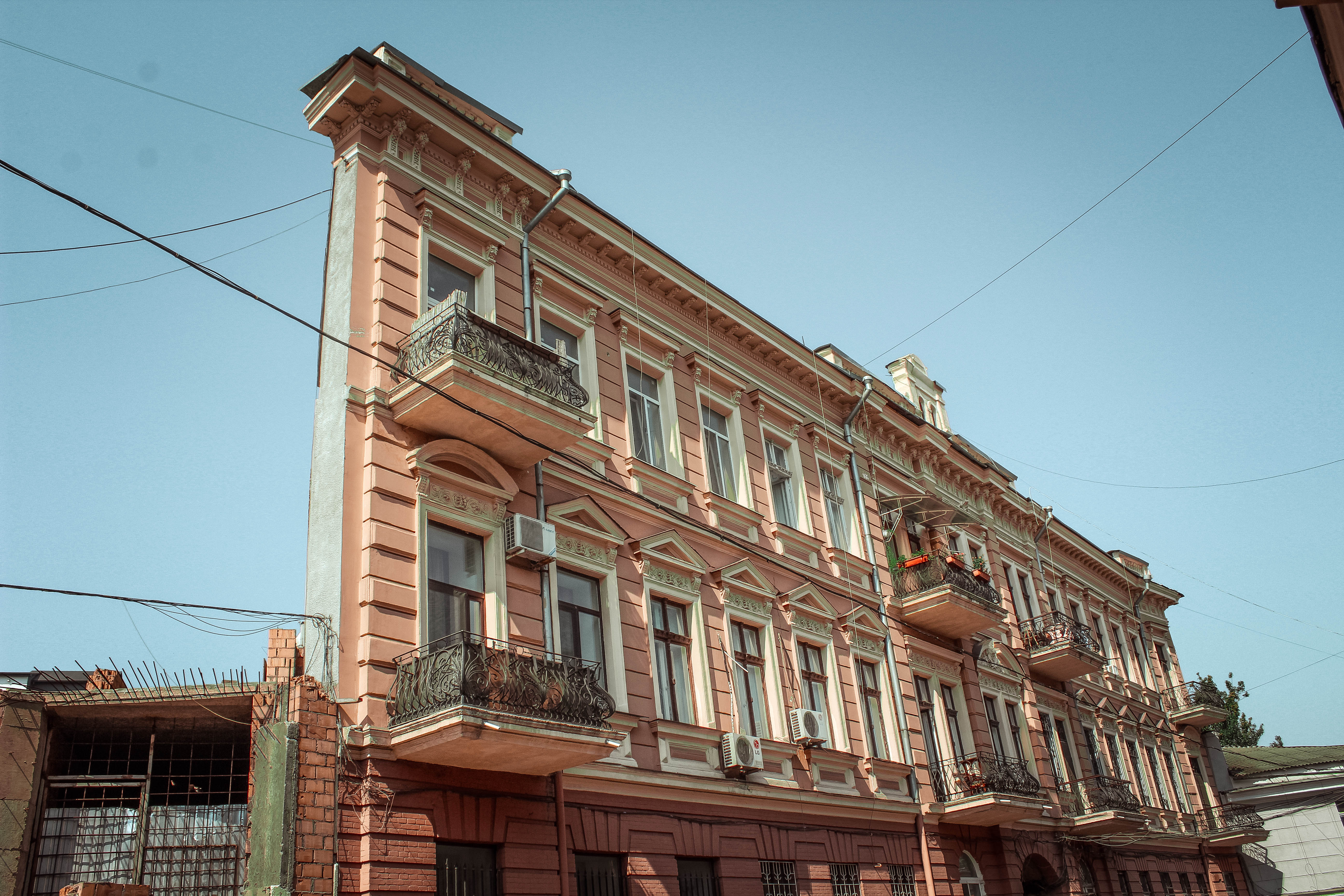
The Wall House

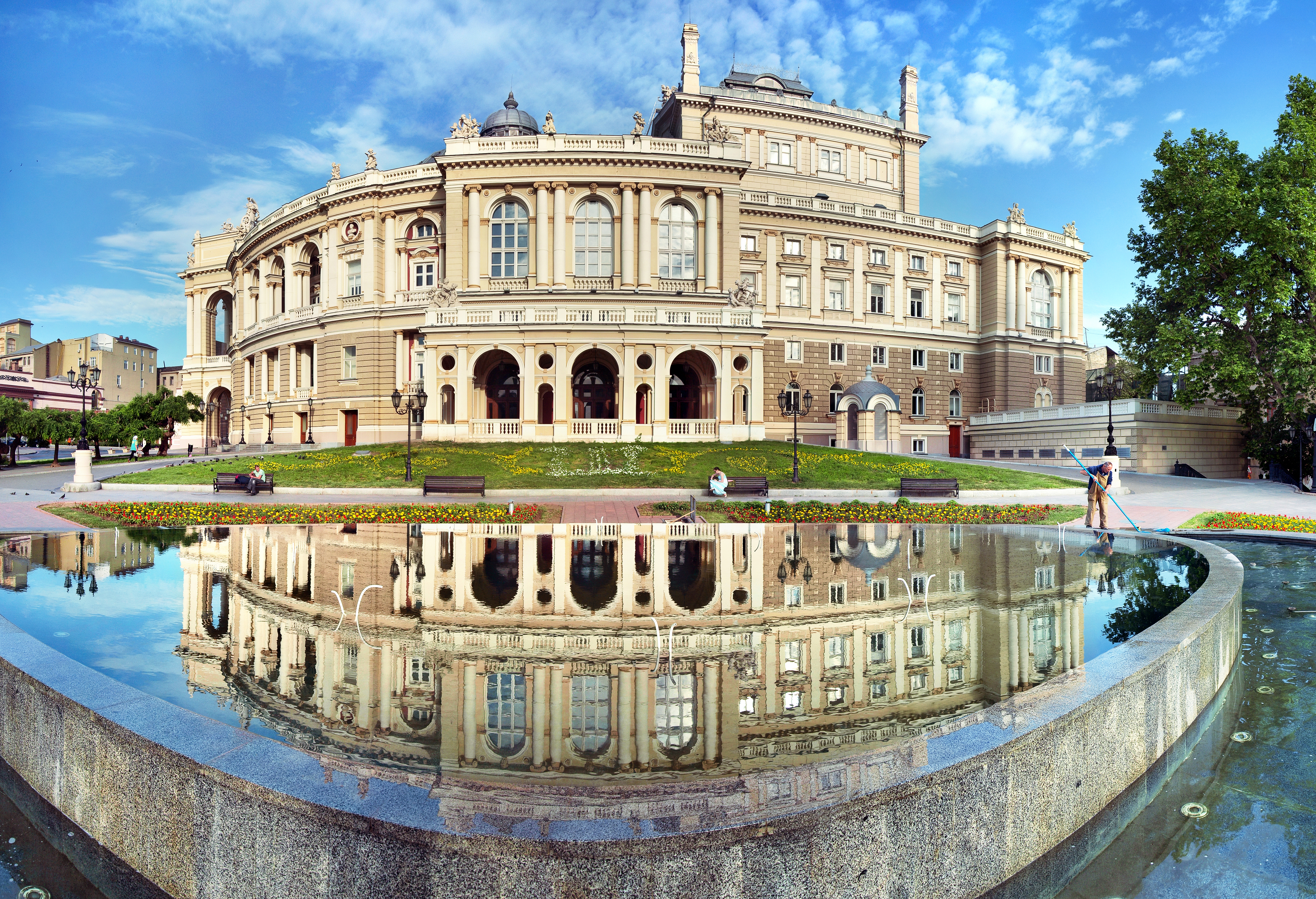
The Opera House

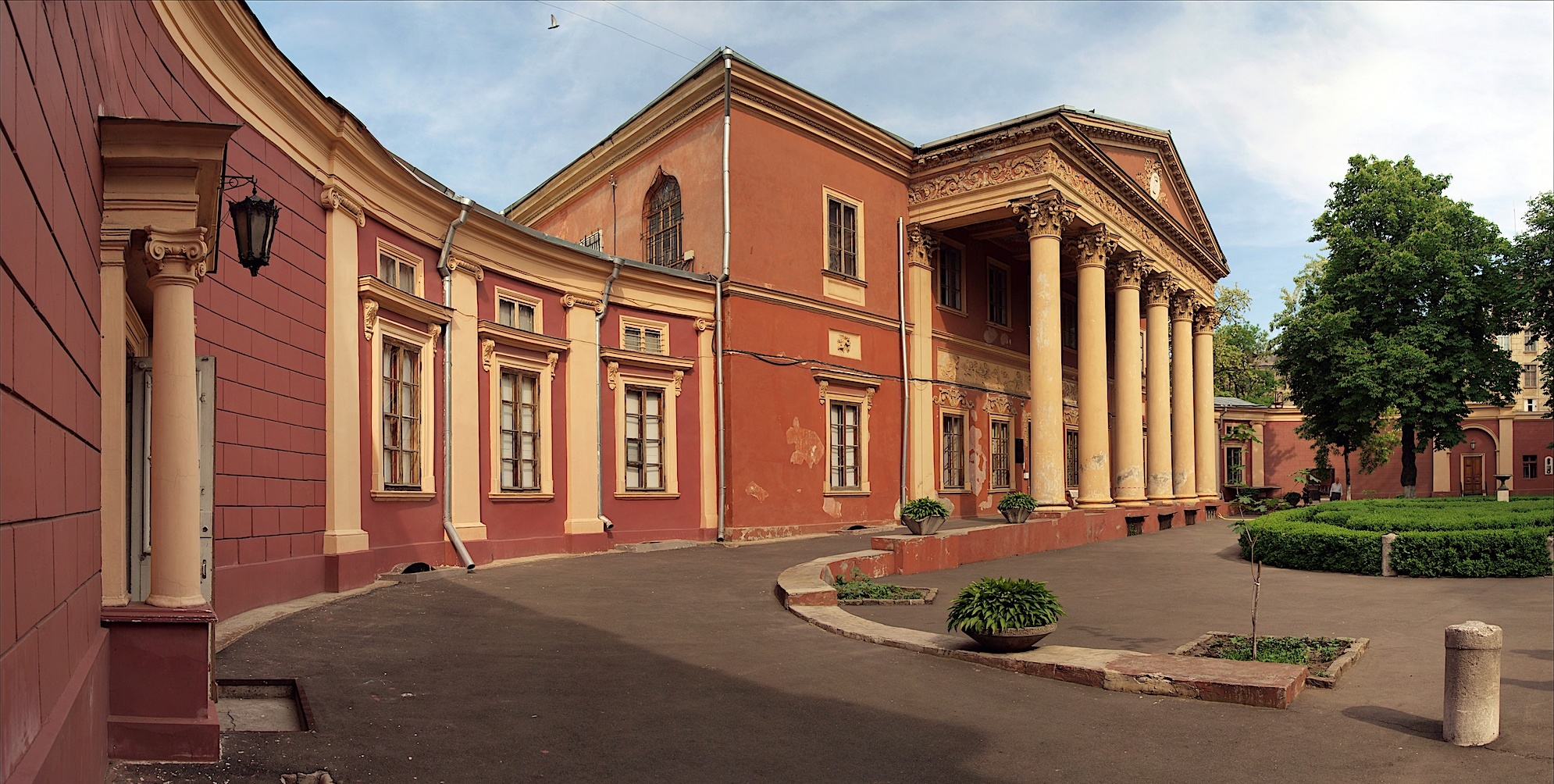
Potocki Palace

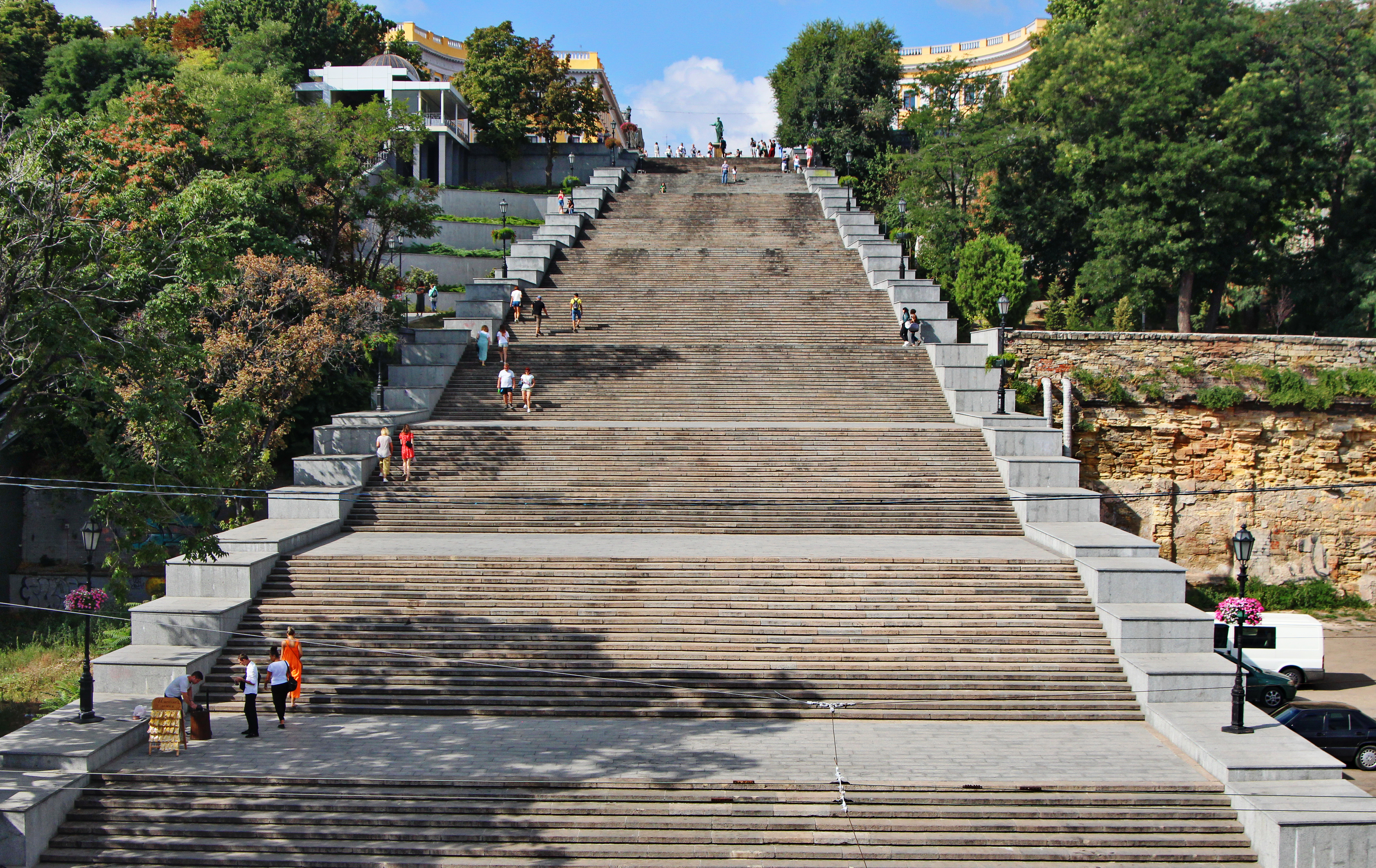
Potemkin stairs

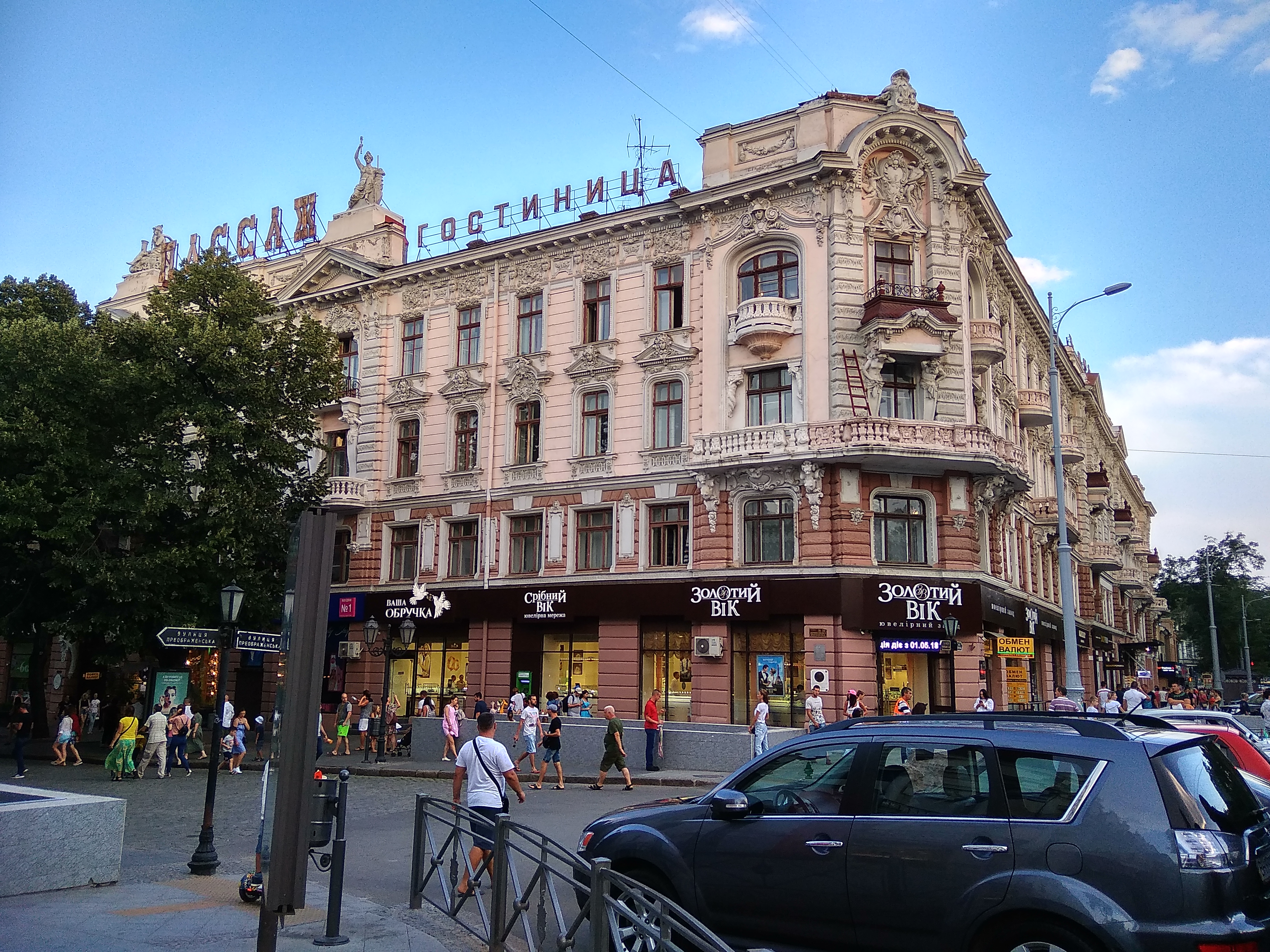
Hotel Passage

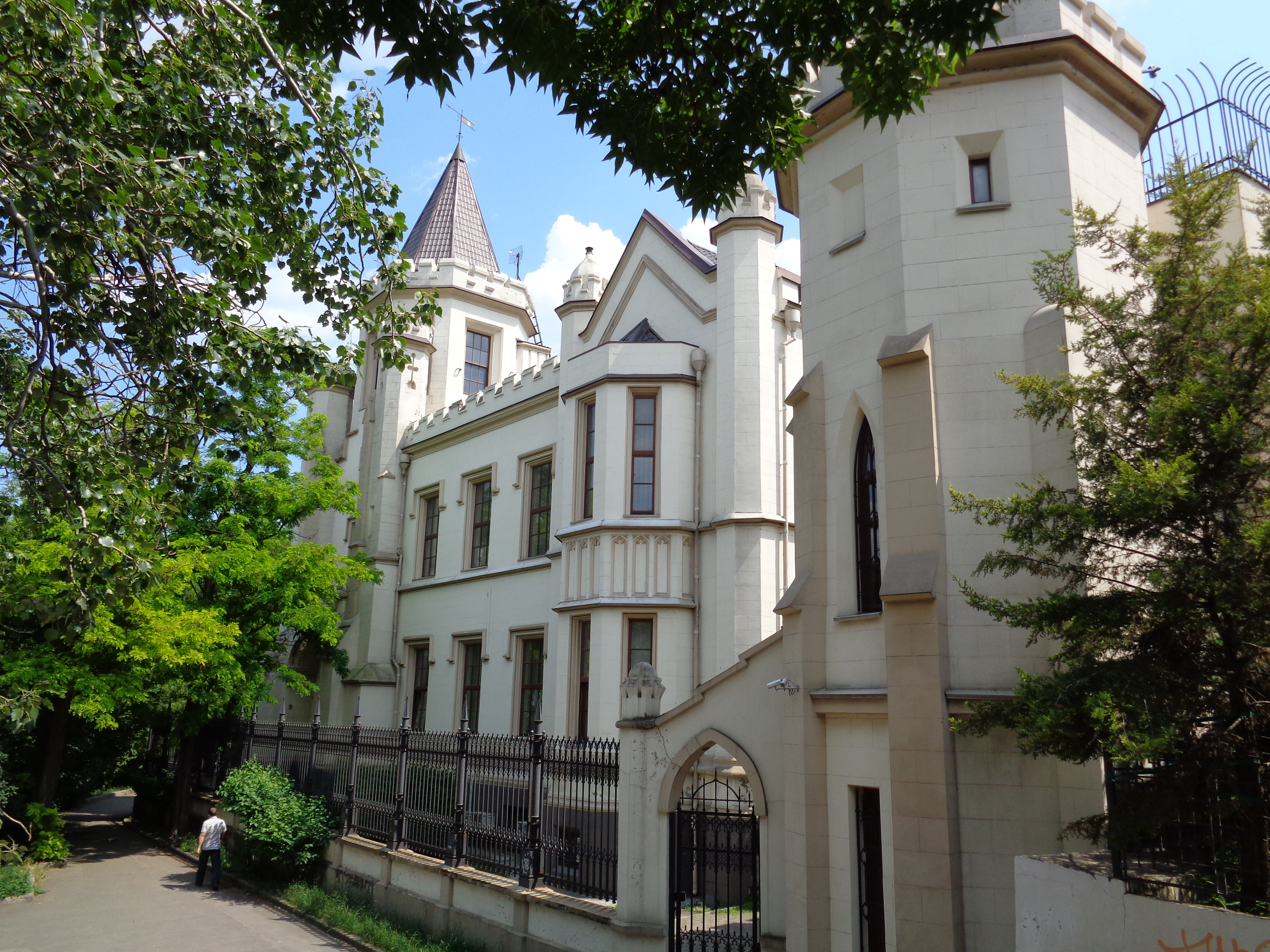
Bzhozovsky Palace

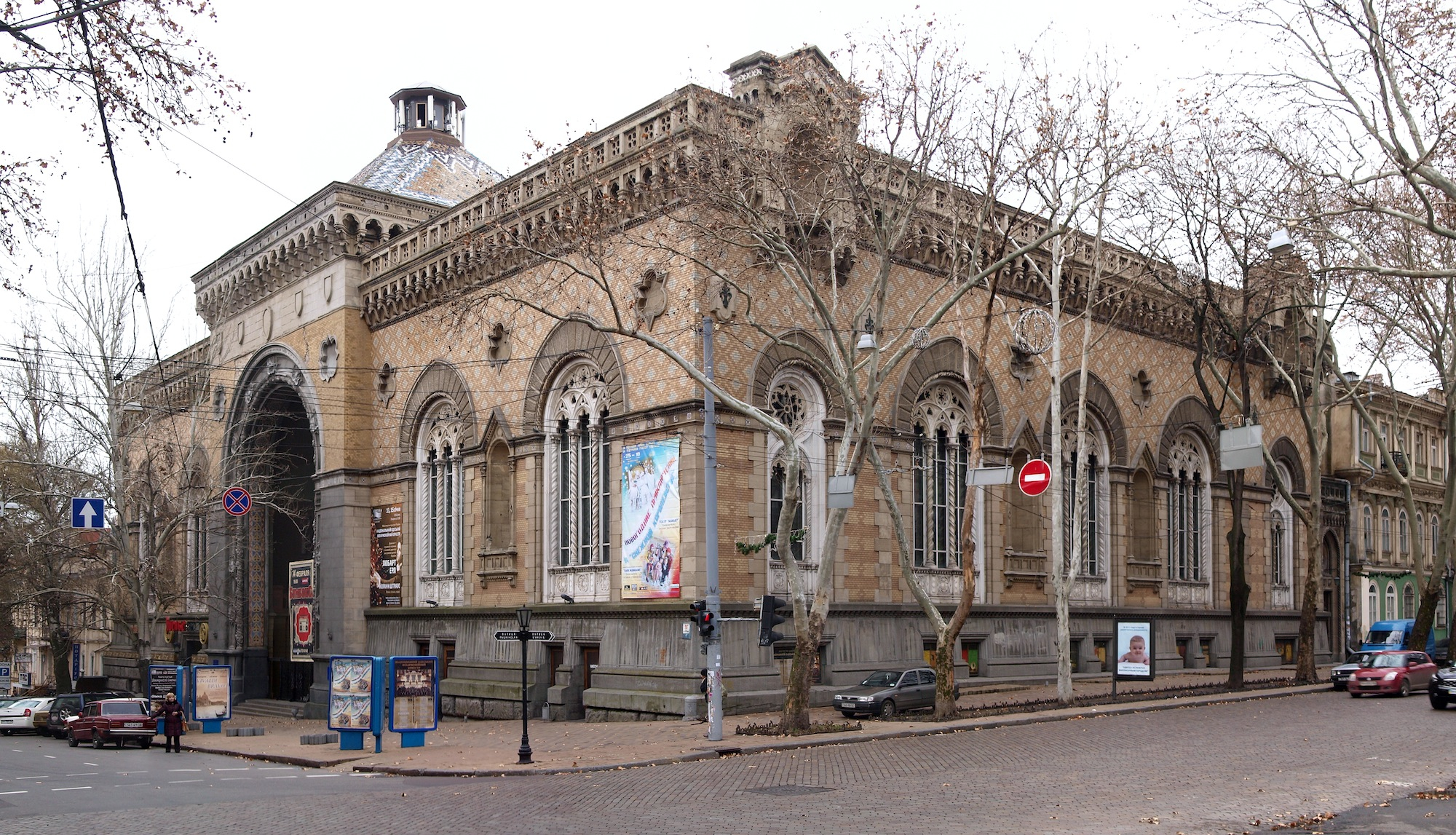
The Philharmonic, a former stock exchange

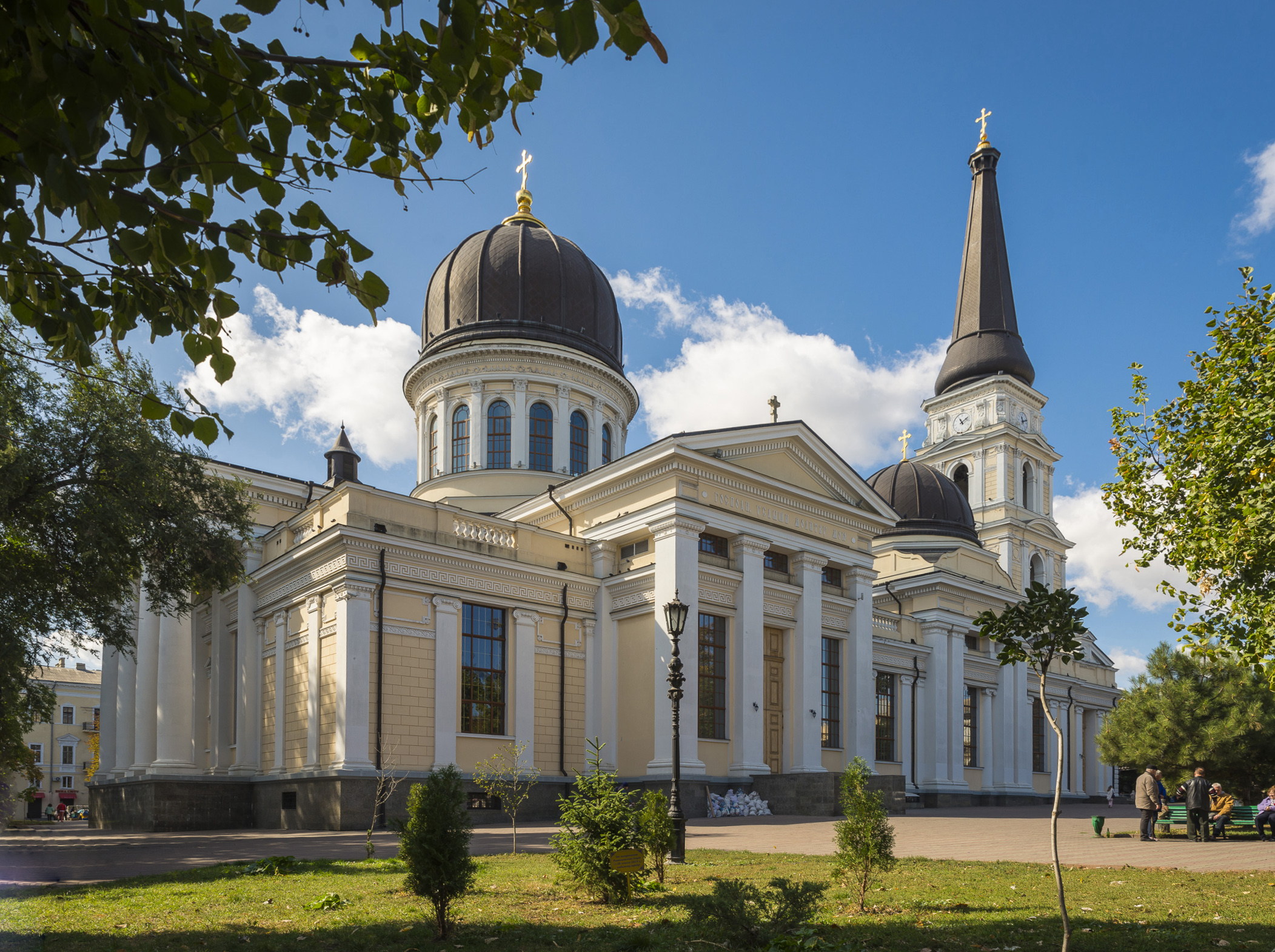
The Transfiguration Cathedral, the largest orthodox cathedral in Odesa

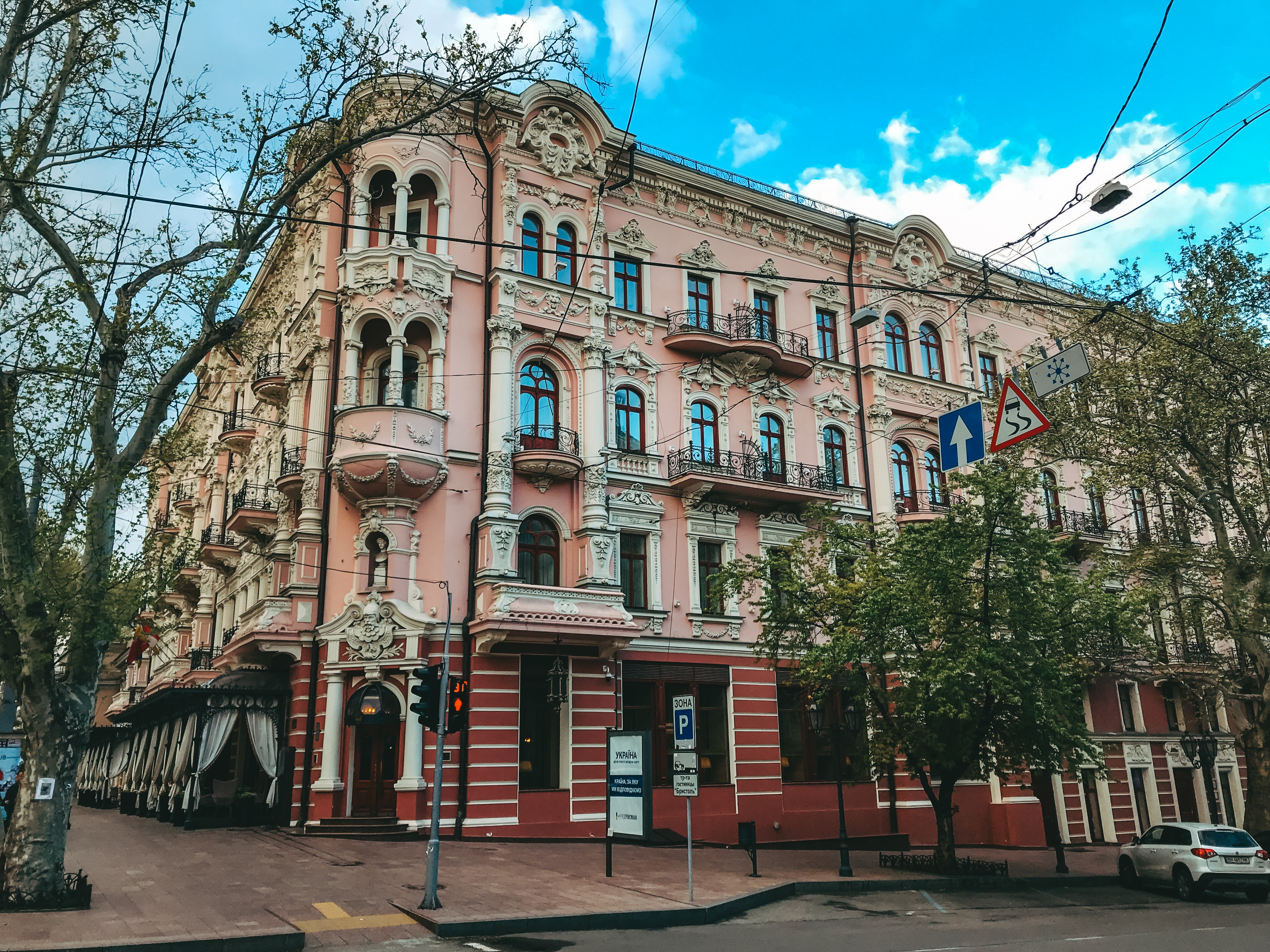
Bristol Hotel

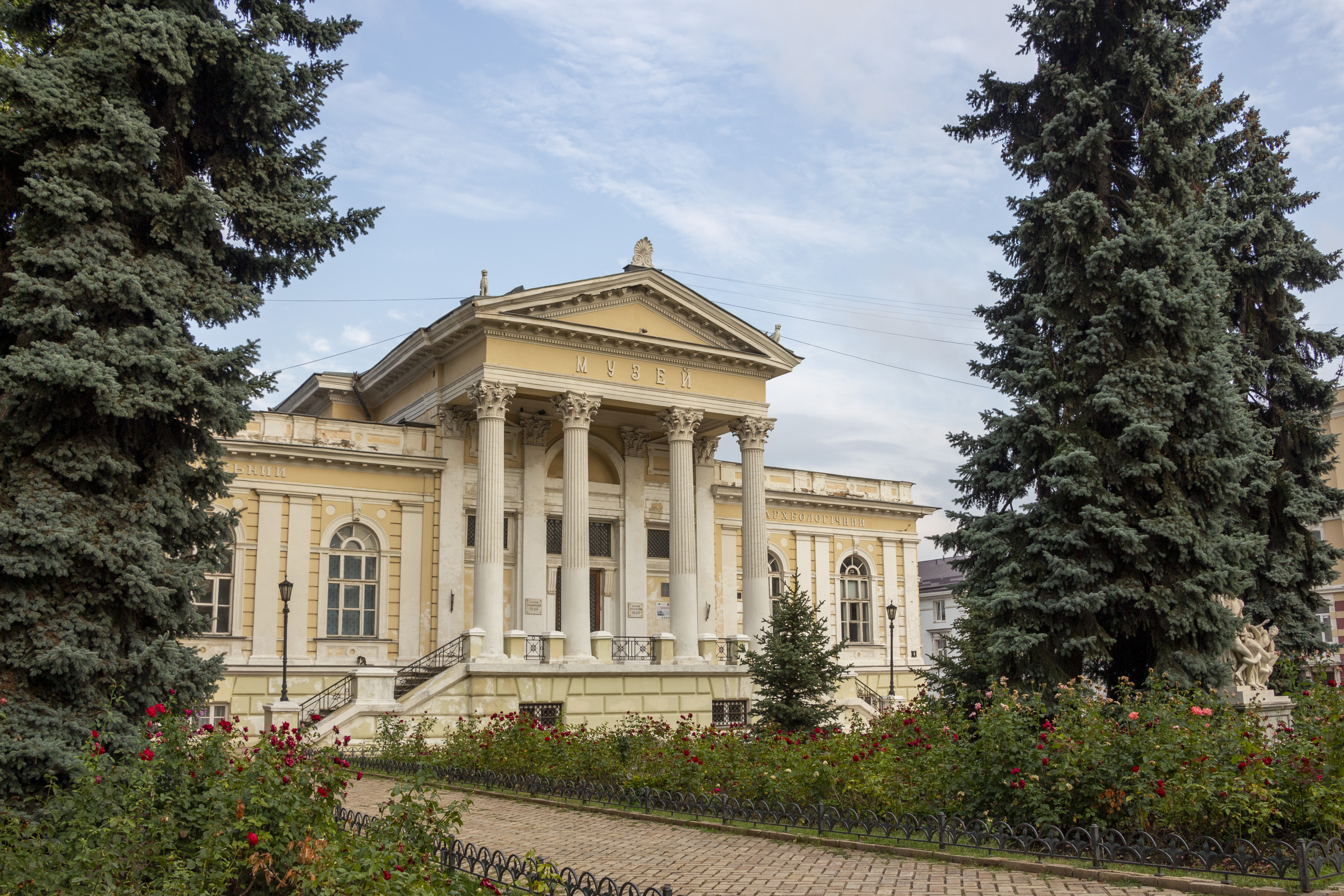
Archaeological Museum

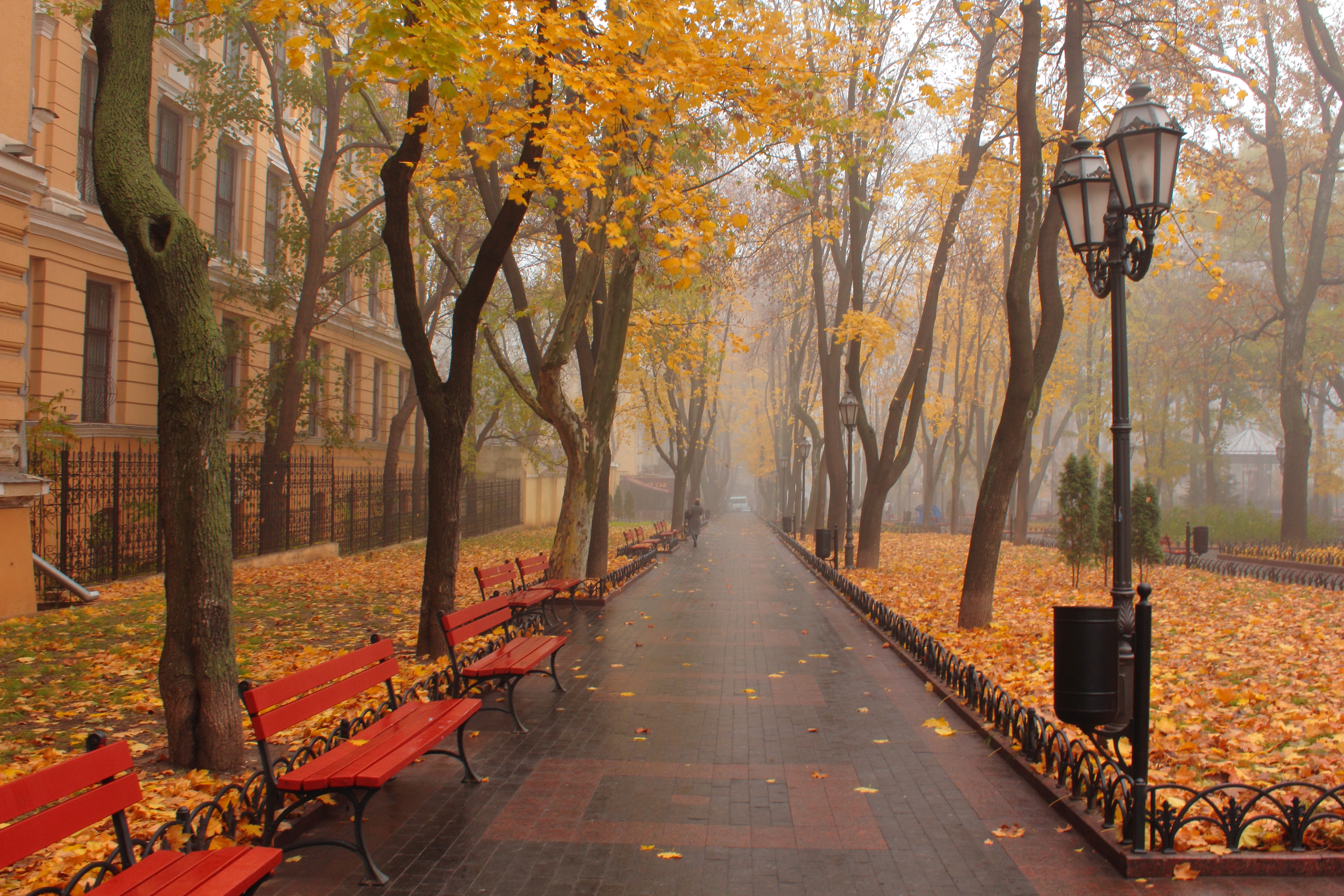
City garden

== Other ==
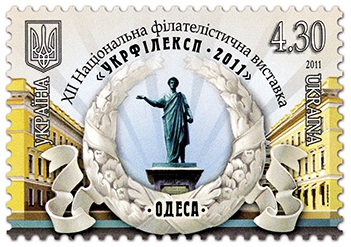
A Ukrainian stamp featuring one of the square's monuments

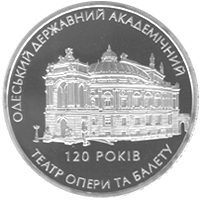
A coin commemorating the 120th anniversary of the Odesa Opera
