= Francesco Boffo =

Sardinian-born Neoclassical architect

Francesco Carlo Boffo (Cyrillic: Франц Карлович Боффо; 8 September 1796 – Cherson, 10 November 1867) was a Neoclassical architect who designed more than 30 buildings in Odesa between 1818 and 1861, including the famous Potemkin Stairs.

Boffo (Boffa in Italian) was born in 1796 in Arosio (now Montagnola near Lugano, Ticino, Switzerland) and was apprenticed to an architect in Ticino. He then joined the University of Turin before entering the service of the Potocki noble family in Poland. He served as Odesa's chief architect between 1822 and 1844. His patrons included Count Michael Vorontsov and his wife, Elisabeth Branicka. Boffo was responsible for transforming Odesa into the open-air museum of Neoclassical architecture, rivalling St. Petersburg in the north of Imperial Russia.

The Potocki Palace (his authorship being disputed), Shidlovsky, and Vorontsov Palaces in Odesa were built to his designs, as was the Czarnomski Palace near Bershad (1817). The latter is famed for its uncanny resemblance to the White House. The Potemkin Stairs, Boffo's most ambitious undertaking, was modeled on the earlier Depaldo Stairs, designed by him for the town of Taganrog in 1823. It was Boffo who conceived a 22-metre memorial column for the Kagul battlefield. He also built the Londonska Hotel building in 1826–28 as a private residence. The architect died in 1867 and he was buried in Odesa.

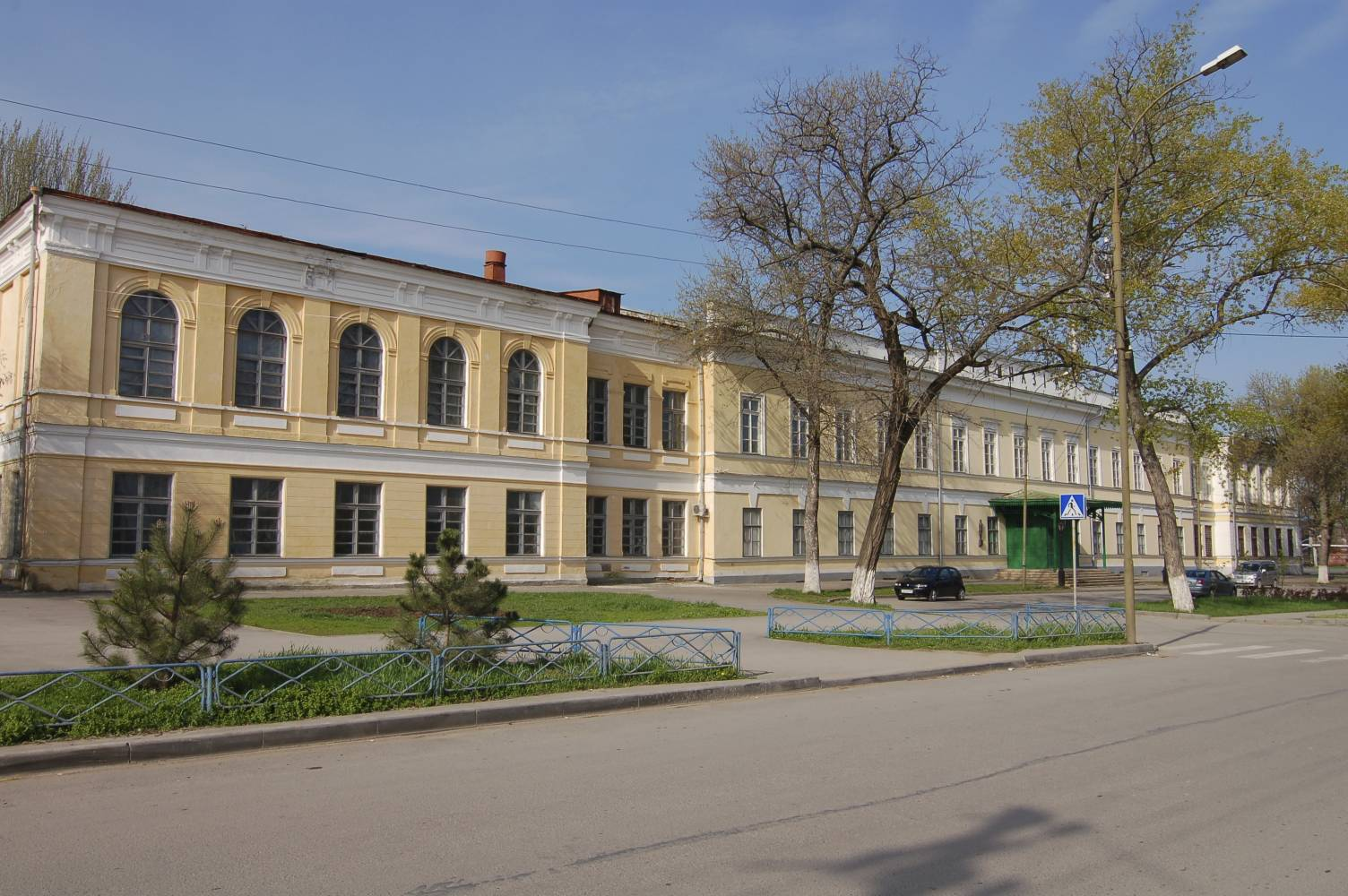
The Chekhov Gymnasium (Taganrog)

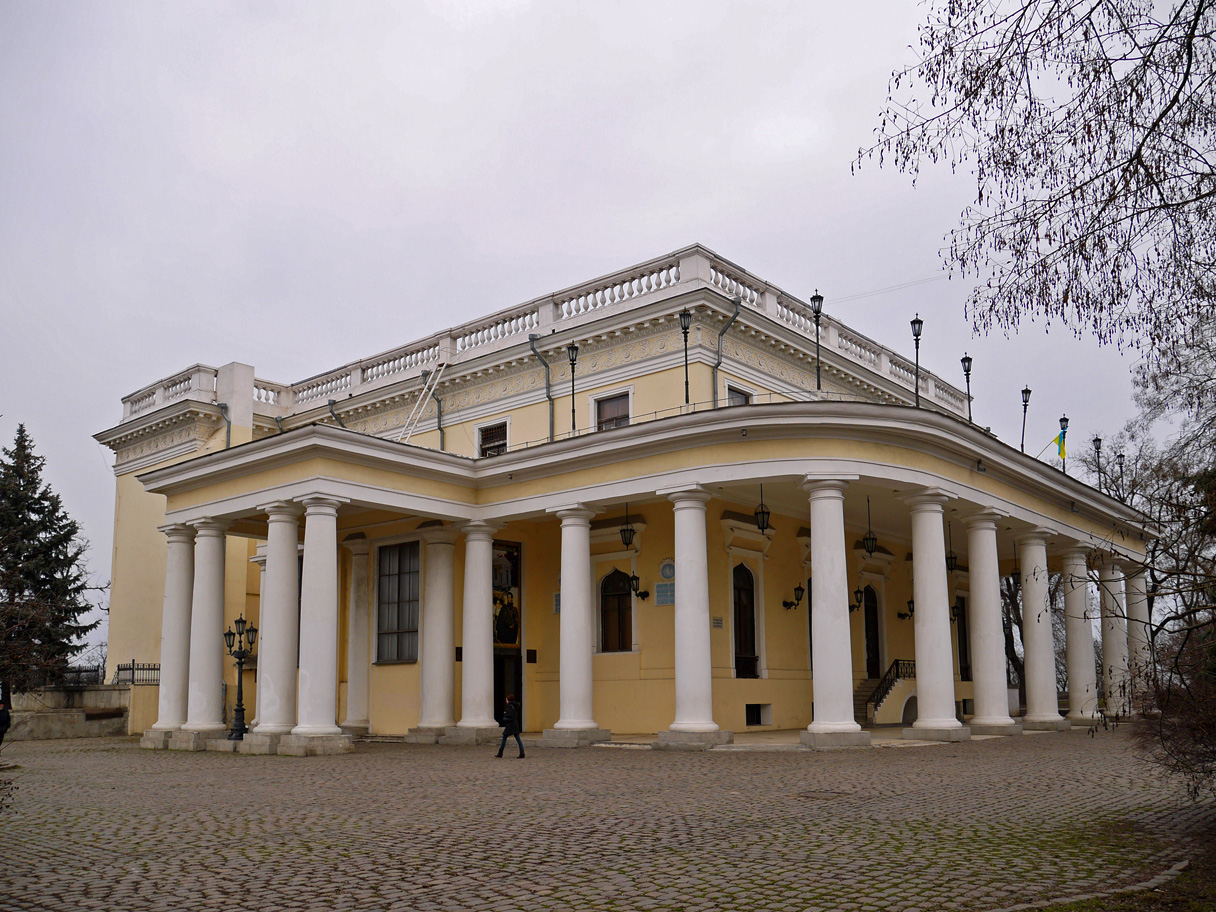
The Vorontsov Palace

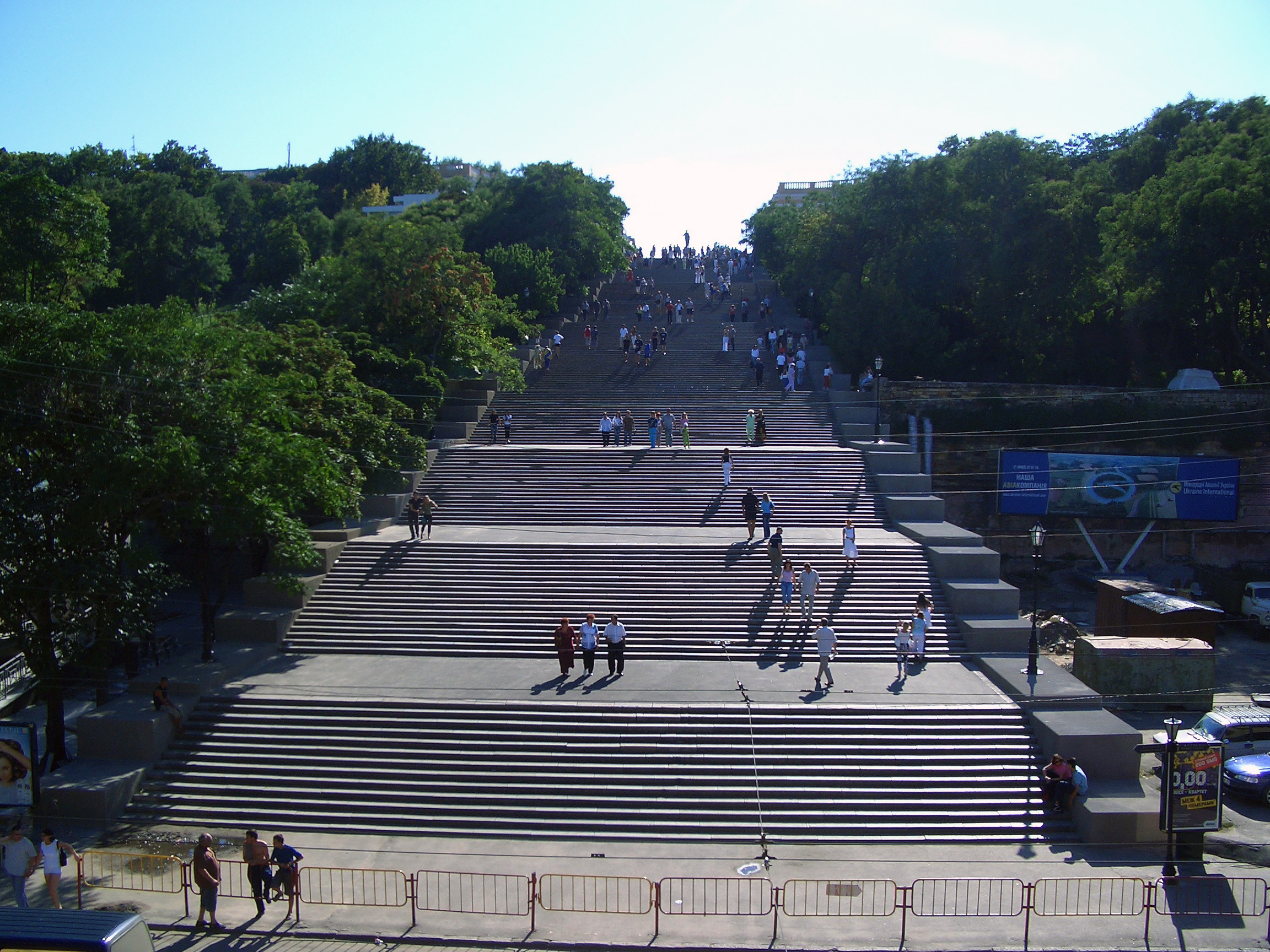
The Potemkin Stairs

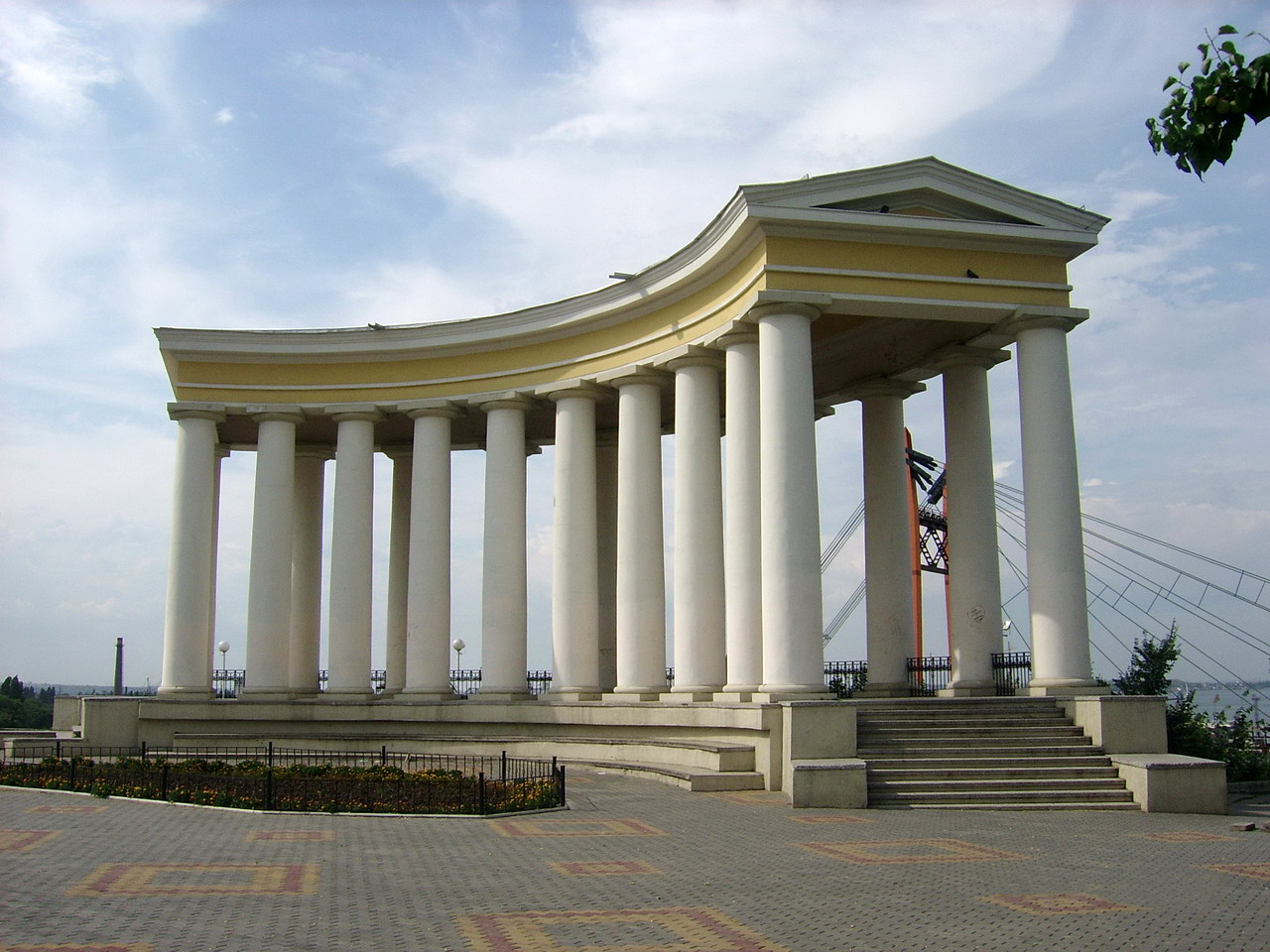
A semicircular colonnade overlooking the Odesa seaport from a cliff

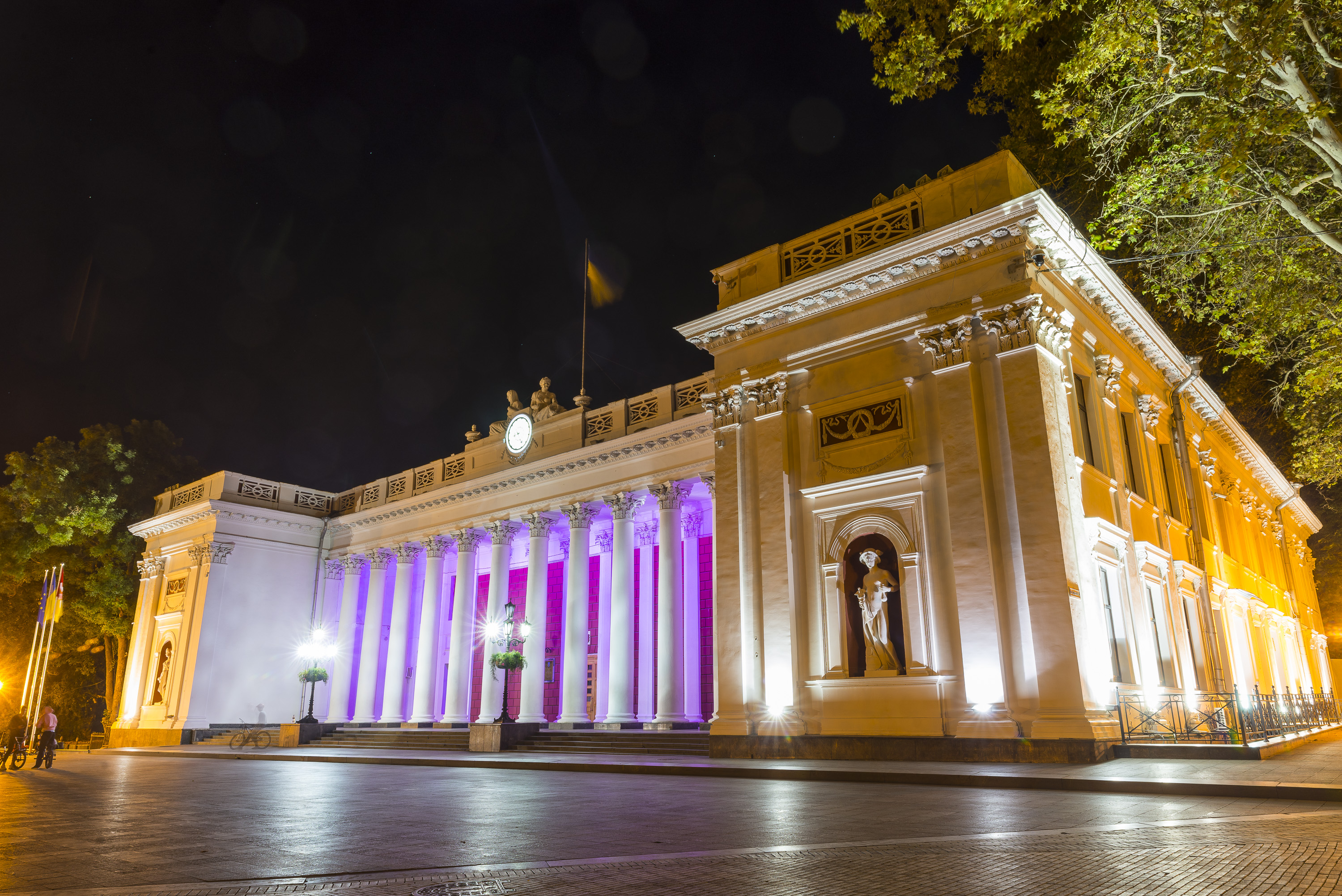
The Odesa City Hall
