= Prymorskyi Boulevard =

Boulevard in Odesa, Ukraine

- Primorsky Boulevard
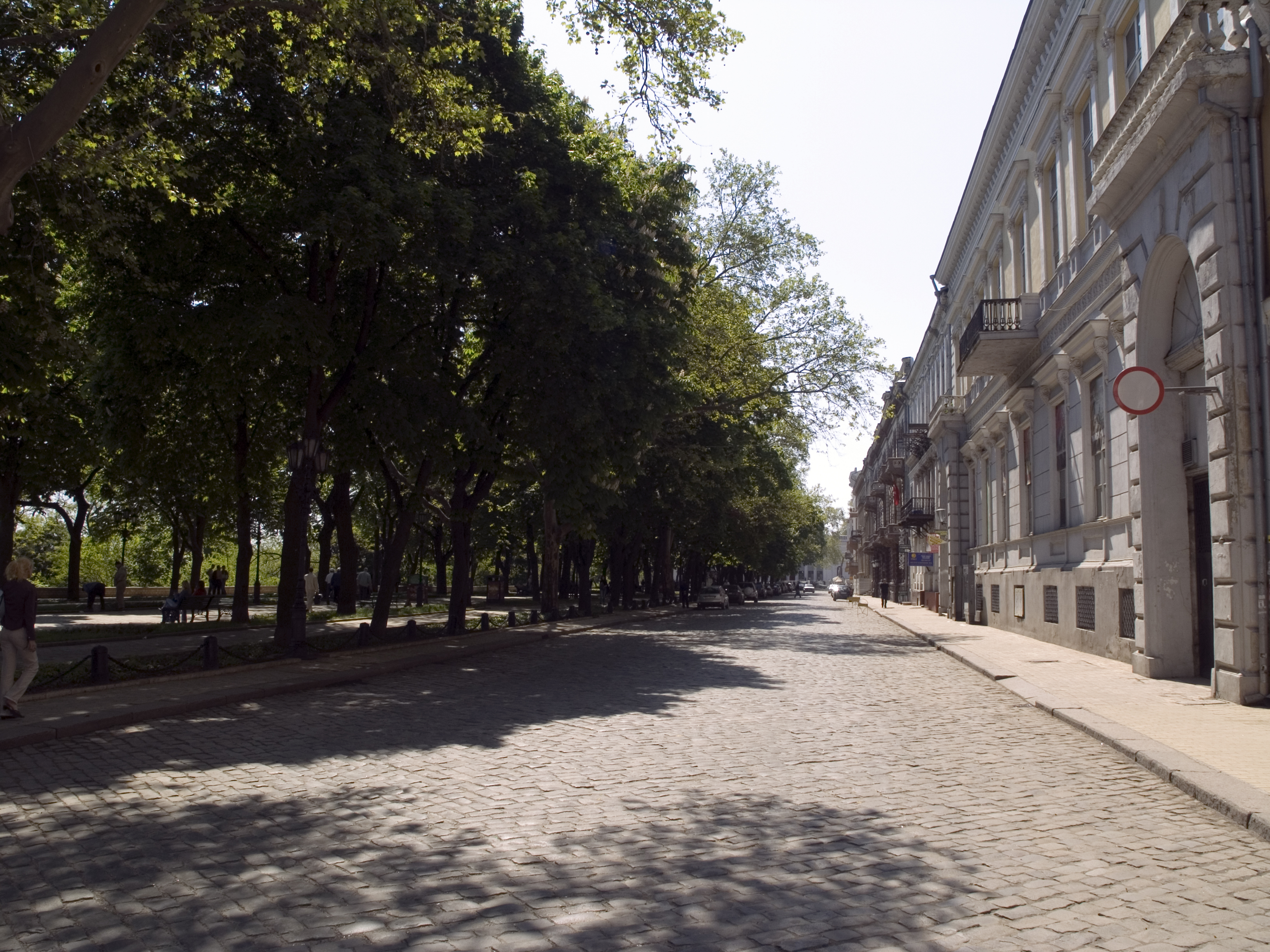
- Interactive map of Prymorskyi Boulevard
- Native name: Приморський бульвар (Ukrainian)
- Former name(s): New Boulevard, Nikolai Boulevard, Feldman Boulevard
- Namesake: Black Sea coast
- Length: 500 m (1,600 ft)
- Coordinates: 46°29′04″N 30°44′04″E
- Italiiska Street end: 46°29′8.26″N 30°44′38.22″E
- Vorontsov Palace end: 46.49014°N 30.73882°E

Construction
- Construction start: 1821

Prymorskyi Boulevard (Ukrainian: Приморський бульвар, romanized: Prymorskyi bulvar, lit. 'Seaside Boulevard'), also known by its Russian-language name as Primorsky Boulevard (Russian: Приморский бульвар) is a street located in the Historic Centre of Odesa, Ukraine. Stretching from Odesa City Hall to Vorontsov Palace, Prymorskyi Boulevard is one of Odesa's primary cultural landmarks, and is home to both the Potemkin Stairs and the statue of the Duke of Richelieu.

== Name ==
Prymorskyi Boulevard has had several names throughout its history. Among these are New Boulevard (Ukrainian: Новий бульвар, romanized: Novyi bulvar; 1827–1831), Nikolai Boulevard (Ukrainian: Миколаївський бульвар, romanized: Mykolaivskyi bulvar; 1877–1920), and Feldman Boulevard (Ukrainian: Бульвар Фельдмана, romanized: Bulvar Feldmana; 1919–1941).

== History ==
Prior to the foundation of Odesa, the area that currently comprises Prymorskyi Boulevard was part of the Khadjibey fortress. Under the governorship of Mikhail Semyonovich Vorontsov, the boulevard was first established as New Boulevard, and became the first asphalt-paved road in the Russian Empire. At this time the boulevard's most notable landmarks, the Voronstov Palace and Potemkin Stairs were both constructed. During the Crimean War, the boulevard was shelled by British and French naval forces.

In 1877, the boulevard was renamed to Nikolai after Nikolai Nikolayevich Malakhov, though the name would later be associated with Nicholas II of Russia. After the Russian Revolution, the boulevard was named after assassinated local commissar Aleksandr Feldman, a move which was parodied in the city's comedy circles.

During the Russian invasion of Ukraine, Prymorskyi Boulevard was subjected to several missile attacks, including a 25 September 2023 strike that damaged nine buildings within the Historic Centre of Odesa World Heritage Site.
