= Potemkin Stairs =

Giant stairway in Odesa, Ukraine

Potemkin Stairs Prymorskyi Stairs
- Stairs
- Потьомкінські сходи (Ukrainian); Приморські сходи (Ukrainian)
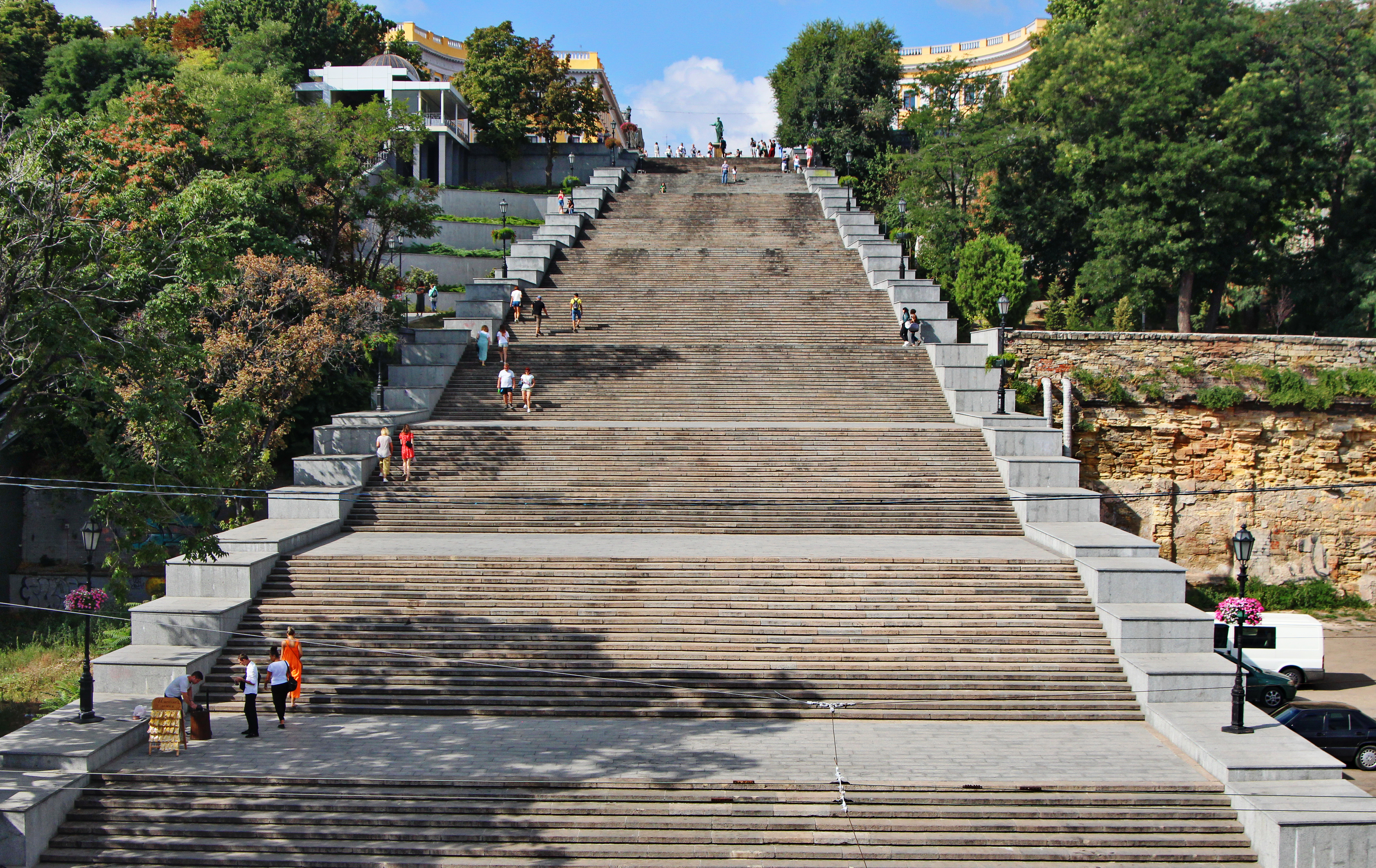
- View from below (2020)
- Design: Francesco Boffo
- Constructed: 1837–1841
- Opened: 1841
- Steps: 192
- Height: 27 m (89 ft)
- Surface: granite, sandstone
- Dedicated to: Battleship Potemkin
- Owner: City of Odesa
- Location: Prymorskyi Boulevard, Odesa, Ukraine
- Interactive map of Potemkin Stairs; Prymorskyi Stairs
- Coordinates: 46°29′21″N 30°44′36″E

The Potemkin Stairs (Ukrainian: Потьомкінські сходи, romanized: Potiomkinski skhody), officially called the Prymorskyi Stairs (Ukrainian: Приморські сходи, romanized: Prymorskyi skhody, lit. 'Seaside Stairs'), are a giant stairway in Odesa, Ukraine. They are considered a formal entrance into the city from the direction of the sea and are the best known symbol of Odesa.

The neoclassical stairs were commissioned by governor Mikhail Semyonovich Vorontsov and built 1837–1841 according to a design by architect Francesco Boffo. Formerly they were known as the Boulevard Stairs, the Giant Stairs, the Richelieu Stairs and the Vorontsov Stairs. The top step is 12.5 m (41 ft) wide, and the lowest step is 21.7 m (71 ft) wide. The staircase extends for 142 m (466 ft), but it gives the illusion of greater length. Their unofficial name Potemkin Stairs is owned to a scene of the 1925 film Battleship Potemkin by Sergei Eisenstein.

== History ==
=== Construction ===
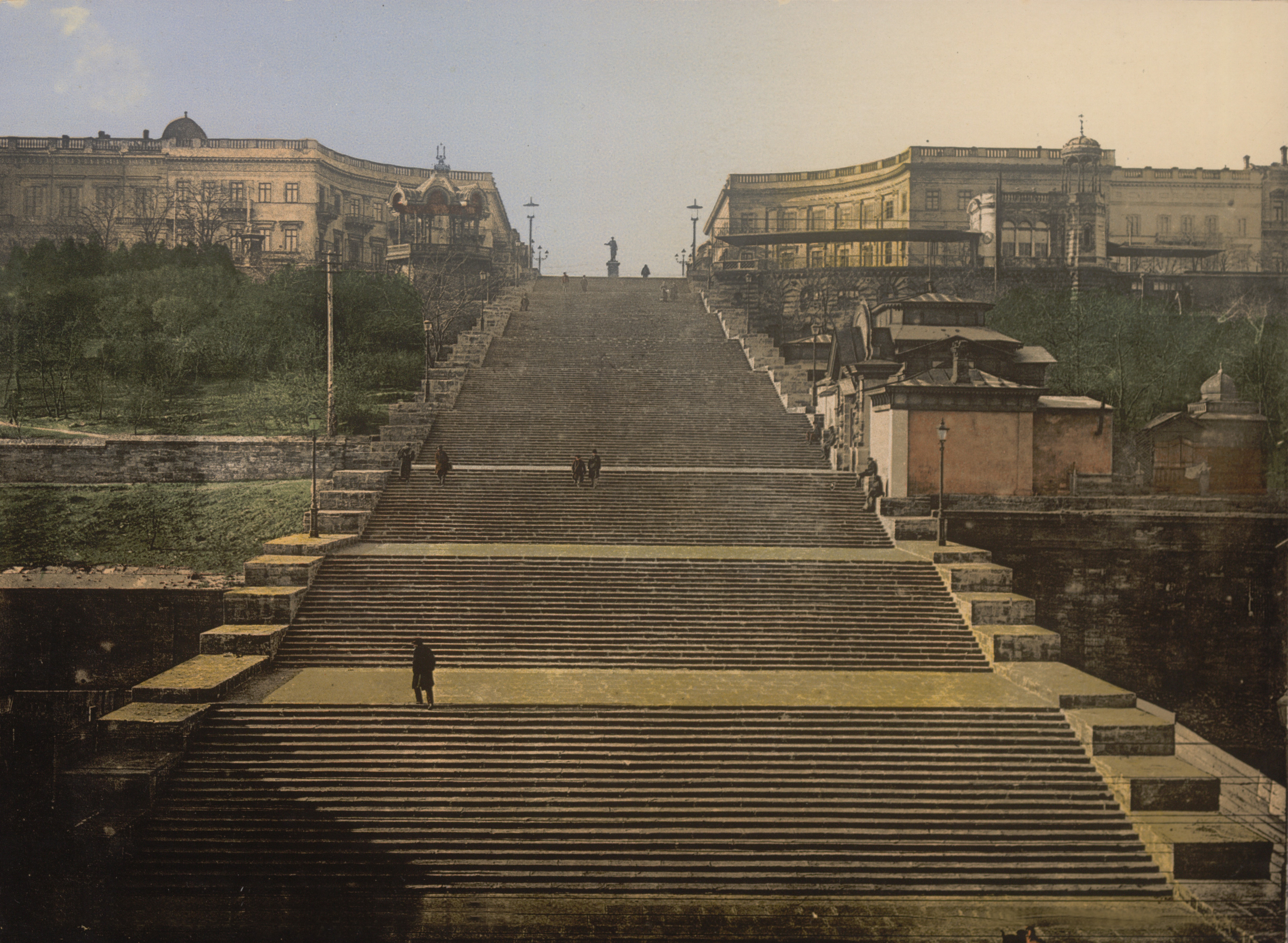
The 142-metre (155 yard) long Potemkin Stairs. Photo from between 1890 and 1900

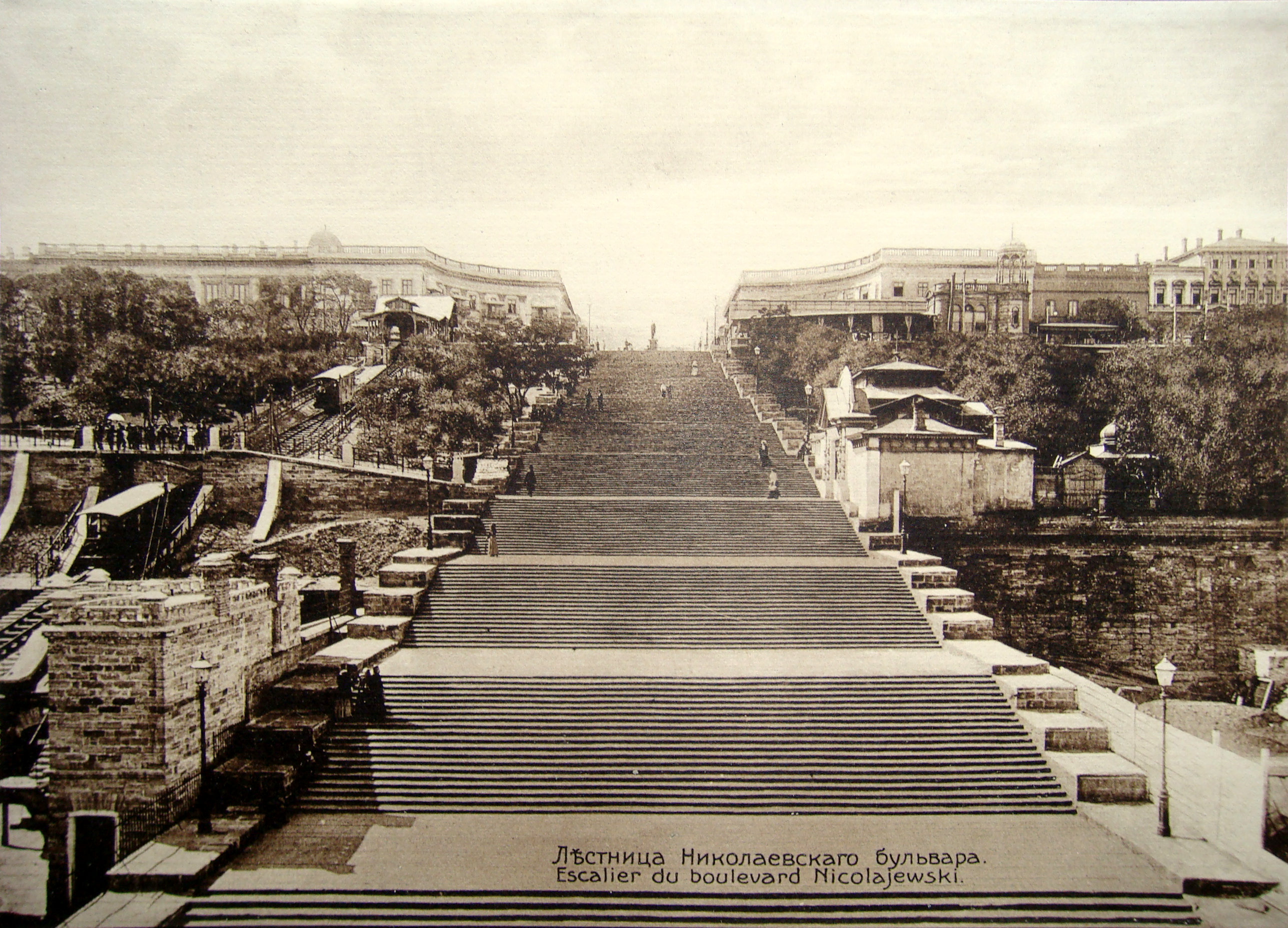
Potemkin Stairs c. early 20th century

Odesa, perched on a high steppe plateau, needed direct access to the harbor below it. Before the stairs were constructed, winding paths and crude wooden stairs were the only access to the harbor.

In 1837, the decision was made to build a "monstrous staircase", which was constructed between 1837 and 1841. The original 200 stairs were commissioned by Prince Mikhail Semyonovich Vorontsov, the regional governor-general, as both a gift to his wife Elżbieta née Branicka and to gain support from the local elites, many of whom lived at the top of the future staircase along Prymorskyi Boulevard. Accordingly, they were originally referred to variously as the Primorsky Stairs, or alternatively as the Boulevard Stairs or Giant Stairs.

They were designed in 1837 by Swiss architect Francesco Boffo and St. Petersburg architects Avraam Melnikov and Pot'e. The staircase cost 800,000 rubles to build. Greenish-grey sandstone from the Austrian port of Trieste (now in Italy) was shipped in. English engineer John Upton supervised construction. Upton had fled Britain while on bail for forgery. Upton would go on to oversee the construction of the huge dry-docks constructed in Sevastopol and completed in 1853.

=== Later history ===
On the left side of the stairs, a funicular railway was built in 1906 to transport people up and down instead of walking.

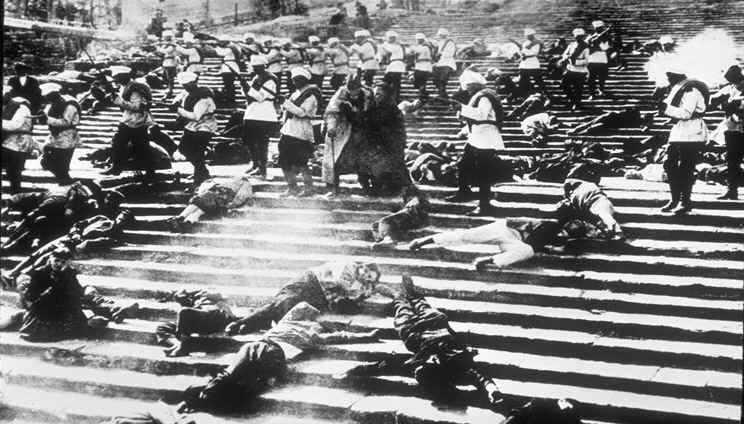
The Potemkin Stairs as seen in Battleship Potemkin

The steps were made famous in Sergei Eisenstein's 1925 silent film Battleship Potemkin.

As erosion destroyed the stairs, in 1933 the sandstone was replaced by rose-grey granite from the Boh area, and the landings were covered with asphalt. Eight steps were lost under the sand when the port was being extended, reducing the number of stairs to 192, with ten landings.

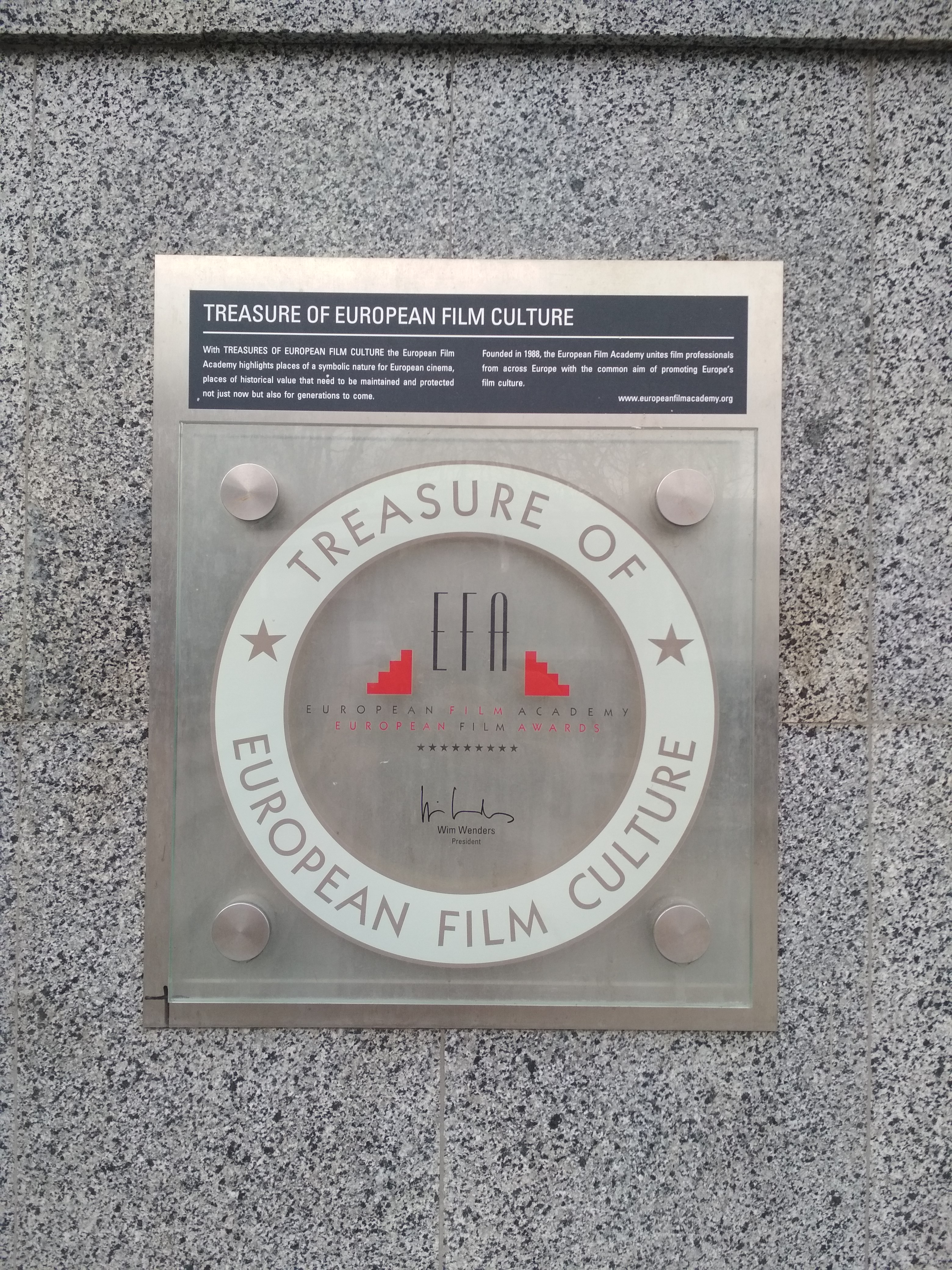
Potemkin Stairs and cinematography

In 1955, during the Soviet era, the Primorsky Stairs were renamed as Potemkin Stairs to honor the 50th anniversary of the mutiny on the battleship Potemkin. After the restoration of Ukrainian independence in 1991, like many streets in Odesa, the historic name, "Primorsky Stairs", was reinstated. On 11 July 2015, during the 6th International Film Festival, the European Film Academy put a commemorative plate on the stairs. The plate indicates that the Potemkin staircase is a memorable place for European cinema.

After 73 years of operation (with breaks caused by revolution and war), the funicular was replaced by an escalator in 1970. The escalator was closed in 1997, but a new funicular was opened on 2 September 2005.

== Duke de Richelieu Monument ==
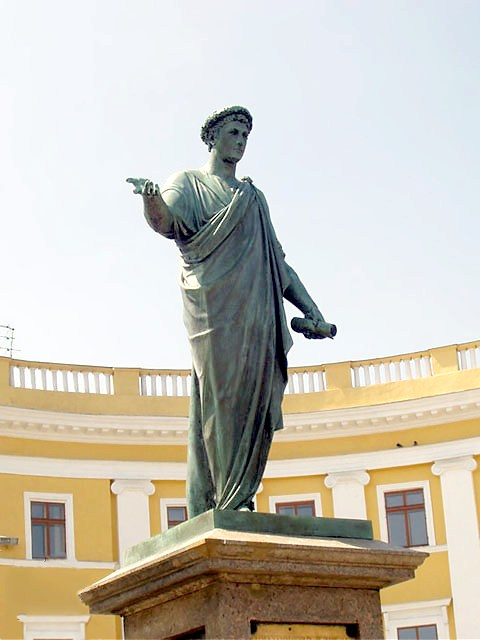
Statue of the Duc de Richelieu

At the top of the stairs is the Duke de Richelieu Monument, depicting Odesa's town governor. The Roman-toga figure was designed by the Russian sculptor, Ivan Petrovich Martos (1754–1835). The statue was cast in bronze by Yefimov and unveiled in 1826. It is the first monument erected in the city, and memorializes him for the period of growth and prosperity he led during the 11 years of his administration.

== Observations and descriptions of the stairs ==
A flight of steps unequalled in magnificence, leads down the declivity to the shore and harbour

This expensive and useless toy, is likely to cost nearly forty thousand pounds.

One of the great sights of Odessa is the staircase street that extends from the harbor shore to the end of the fine boulevard at the top of the hill. Seeing it, don't you involuntarily wonder why such an idea is not oftener carried out? The very simplicity of the design gives it a monumental character; the effect is certainly dignified and majestic. It would be no small task to climb all those stairs. Twenty steps in each flight, ten flights to climb, we should be glad of the ten level landings for breathing space before we reached the top of the hill.

From the centre of the Boulevard, a staircase called the "escalier monstre" descends to the beach. The contractor for this work was ruined. It is an ill-conceived design if intended for ornament; its utility is more than doubtful and its execution defective, that its fall is already anticipated. An Odessa wag has prophesied that the Duc de Richelieu, whose statue is at the top, will be the first person to go down it.

Viewed from one side, the figure [Duke de Richelieu Monument] seems so miserable that wags claim that it seems to be saying "'Give money here'"

Seen from below the vast staircase [the Duke de Richelieu Monument] "appeared crushed" and, the statue should have been of colossal dimensions or else it should have been placed elsewhere.

== Gallery ==
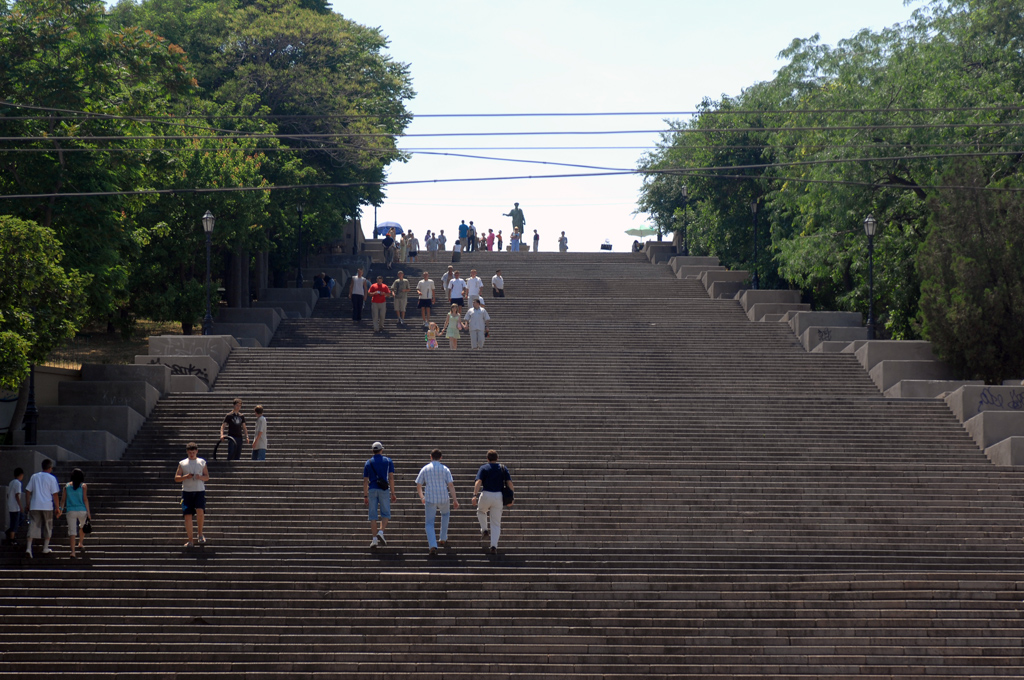
Potemkin Stairs; the landings are invisible from the bottom.

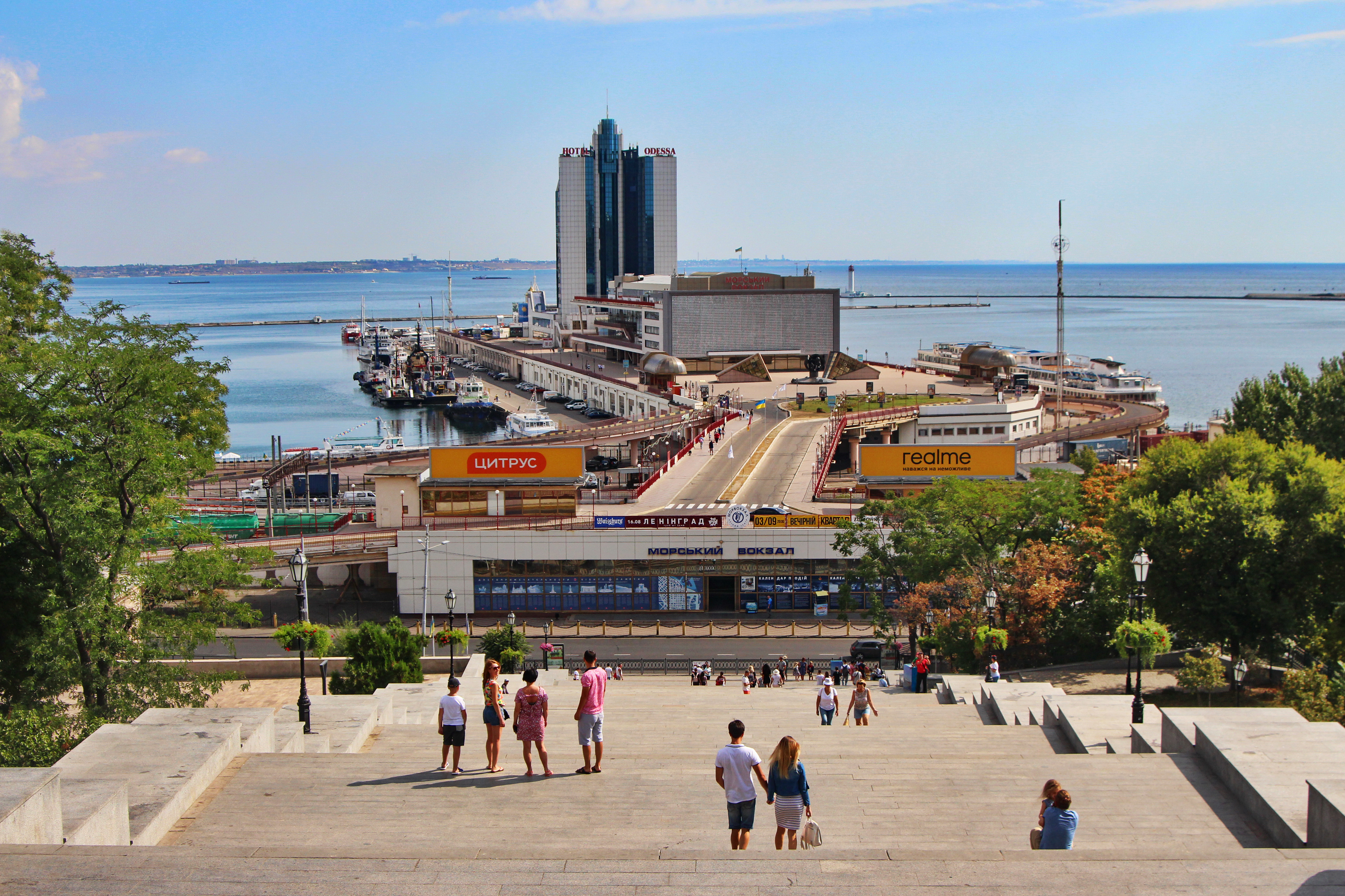
Potemkin Stairs; the steps are invisible from the top.

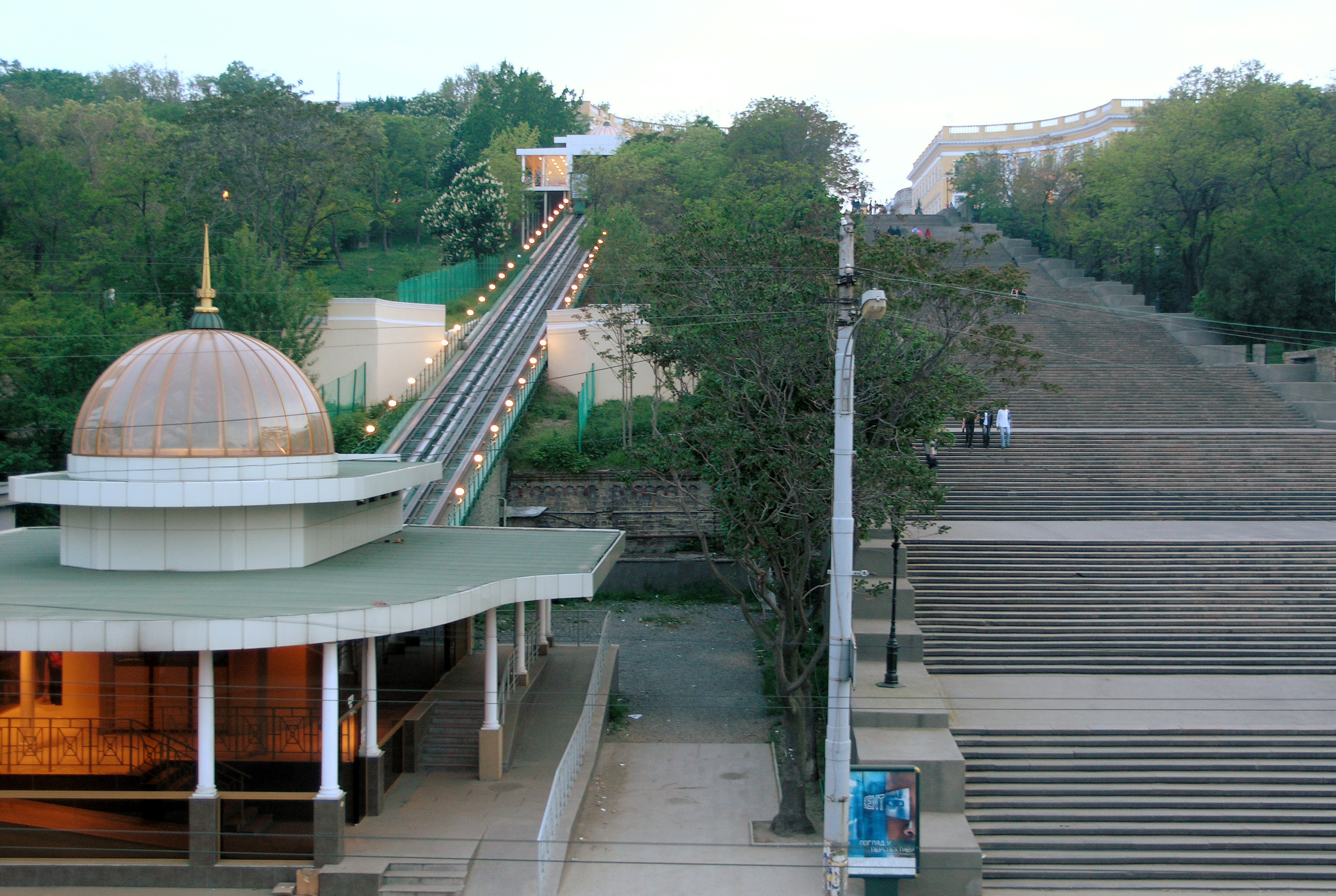
The lower station of the Odesa Funicular, with the Potemkin Stairs on the right

== See also ==
- Odesa Funicular
- Depaldo stone stairs
- Yerevan Cascade
- FC Chornomorets Odesa
- The Filatov Institute of Eye Diseases & Tissue Therapy
- Odesa Opera and Ballet Theatre
- Seventh-Kilometer Market
- Rocky Steps
- Joker Stairs
- Exorcist steps
