= Konstantin Skoptsov =

Ukrainian artist

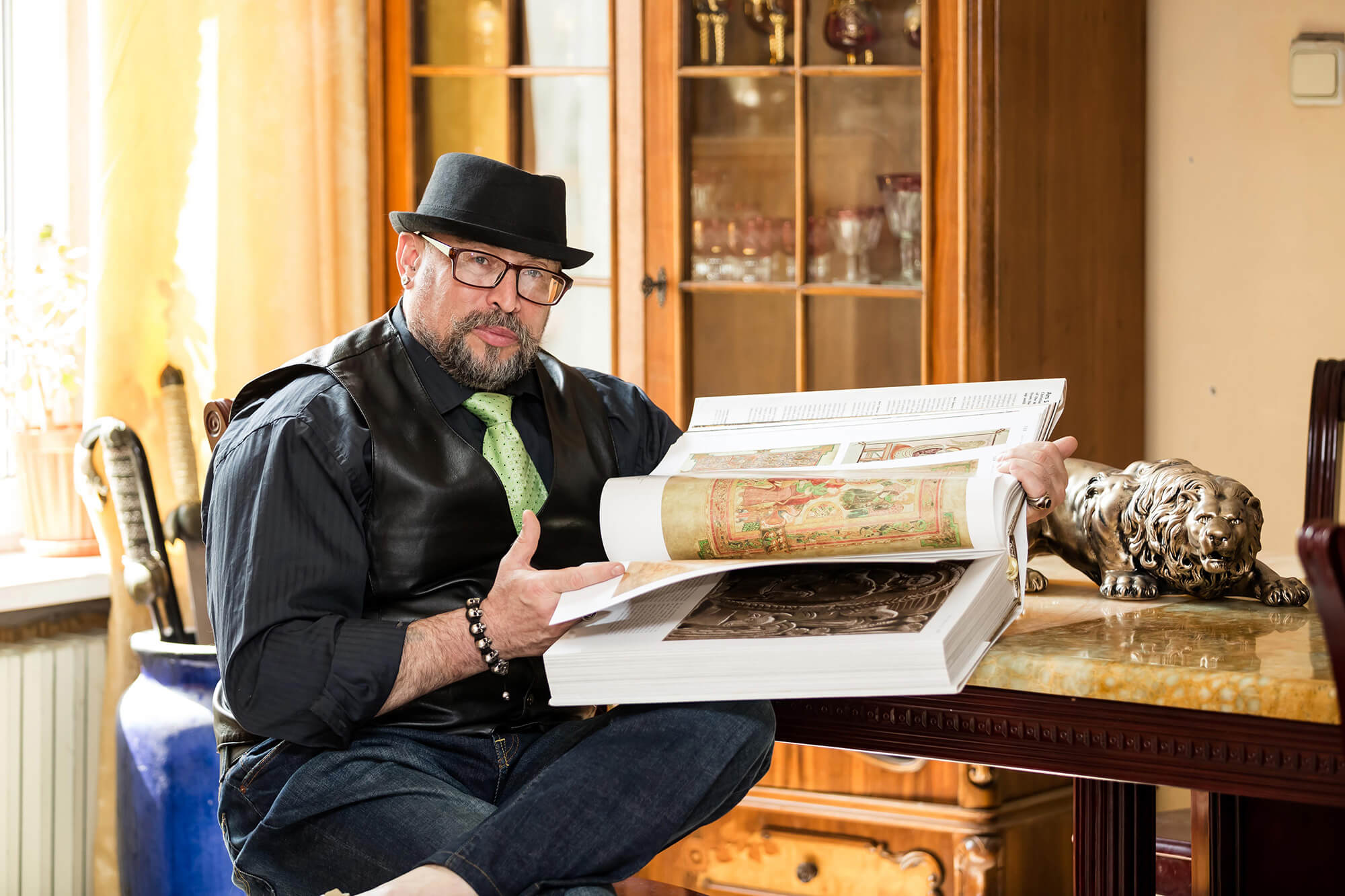
- Born: Konstantin Michailivich Skoptsov; 13 December 1958 (age 67); Odesa, Ukraine
- Known for: Painting, graphics, illustration
- Movement: Semantic realism
- Website: konstantin-skoptsov.com

Konstantin Skoptsov (Ukrainian: Скопцо́в Костянти́н Миха́йлович) (born 13 December 1958) is a Ukrainian artist, drawing artist, painter and an illustrator.

== Biography ==
Skoptsov was born in Odesa, Ukraine. After completing middle school, he began working as a metalworker while simultaneously pursuing his interests in drawing and illustration. He served in the USSR Airforce, and upon the conclusion of his military service, he attempted to enter arts major programs in Odesa and Moscow. However, during his pursuit of formal education, he discovered that the subject matter requirements imposed by the Communist Party conflicted with his artistic vision and personal beliefs. As a result, Skoptsov abandoned his efforts towards obtaining a college degree and instead joined the growing underground movement of young and politically independent artists.

== Artist career ==
His first public exhibitions started in 1976, mostly in the apartment galleries hosted by private art collectors, accessible by invitation only.

Today, his works are displayed throughout the world, in major galleries and museums.

In 2000 Skoptsov was introduced to his future mentor, Temistokl Vyrsta, a renowned French abstractionist. This relationship had marked an important milestone in the artist's career as he became a representative of the French Art Association Fenix and established a large presence in Paris, in collaboration with the art project Paris School of Ukrainian Painting.

In 2004, Skoptsov received a recognition award by Sovereign Military Hospitaller Order of Saint John for his illustrations to Henri de Régnier.

Concurrently he was awarded an Honorary Fellowship by the Russian-Italian Academy Ferroni for illustrations to Dante Alighieri, as well as an essay on Giotto di Bondone's frescoes at the La Basilica di San Francesco d'Assisi.

Skoptsov develops and promotes his signature Semantic Realism style, and uses a variety of media for his artistic inspirations, from canvas and paper to natural leather.

He considers such Masters of drawing and painting as Pieter Bruegel the Elder and Hieronymus Bosch to be an inspiration and predecessors of Semantic Realism.

Based on his own interviews and similarity in themes and style, he is frequently referred to as "Bosch From Odesa" by the Ukrainian media.

Currently, Konstantin Skoptsov lives and works in his home city of Odesa, continuing collaborations with international galleries and museums.

== Quotes From Him ==
- About Drawing and Painting: “Line expresses everything permanent, while color – transient. The line, reigning this world, determines everything – it is a solely abstract symbol: Line reflect both character of the subject and unity of narrative. Line defines the whole atmosphere and fixates your feelings. Reality here can only serve as a starting point for Art to travel to the place where Idea dwells “Clothed in sensual form”.
- About Underground: “True art was and always will be an outsider, staying beyond the limits of the aquarium of art life and always remote from the crafty art feeder. It is the “salt”, without it art becomes bland, it is the “cut” of the diamond, and as defined by Jean Cocteau, reflects artistic aristocracy. Only when we look at the pieces created by such artists as Van Gogh, Gauguin, and Modigliani, cast out by contemporaries, we see deeply into fundamental reasoning of art”.

== Quotes About Him ==
- By Russian Art Critic Stanislav Aidenyan: "His [Konstantin Skoptsov's] name is among the most talented graphic artists in Odesa.

Konstantin is an artist and a poet, though also is known to be a kind of a philosopher, a thinker who encourages submerging into the subconscious mind.

His creative work combines avant-garde and tradition, mysticism and unchained elaborate imagery... That could be said in reference to both his visually- artistic and literary-poetic experiments".

- By Ukrainian journalist Viktor Tymoshenko: “the subjects [of Skoptsov artworks] are inspired by the ancient Chinese and Japanese poets, by the couplets of their genius creations.

It is a mystery how Konstantin Skoptsov "materializes", populates a sheet of paper with dreams, "phantoms", horrors, outer worlds of the remote, unfamiliar to us time".

== Gallery ==
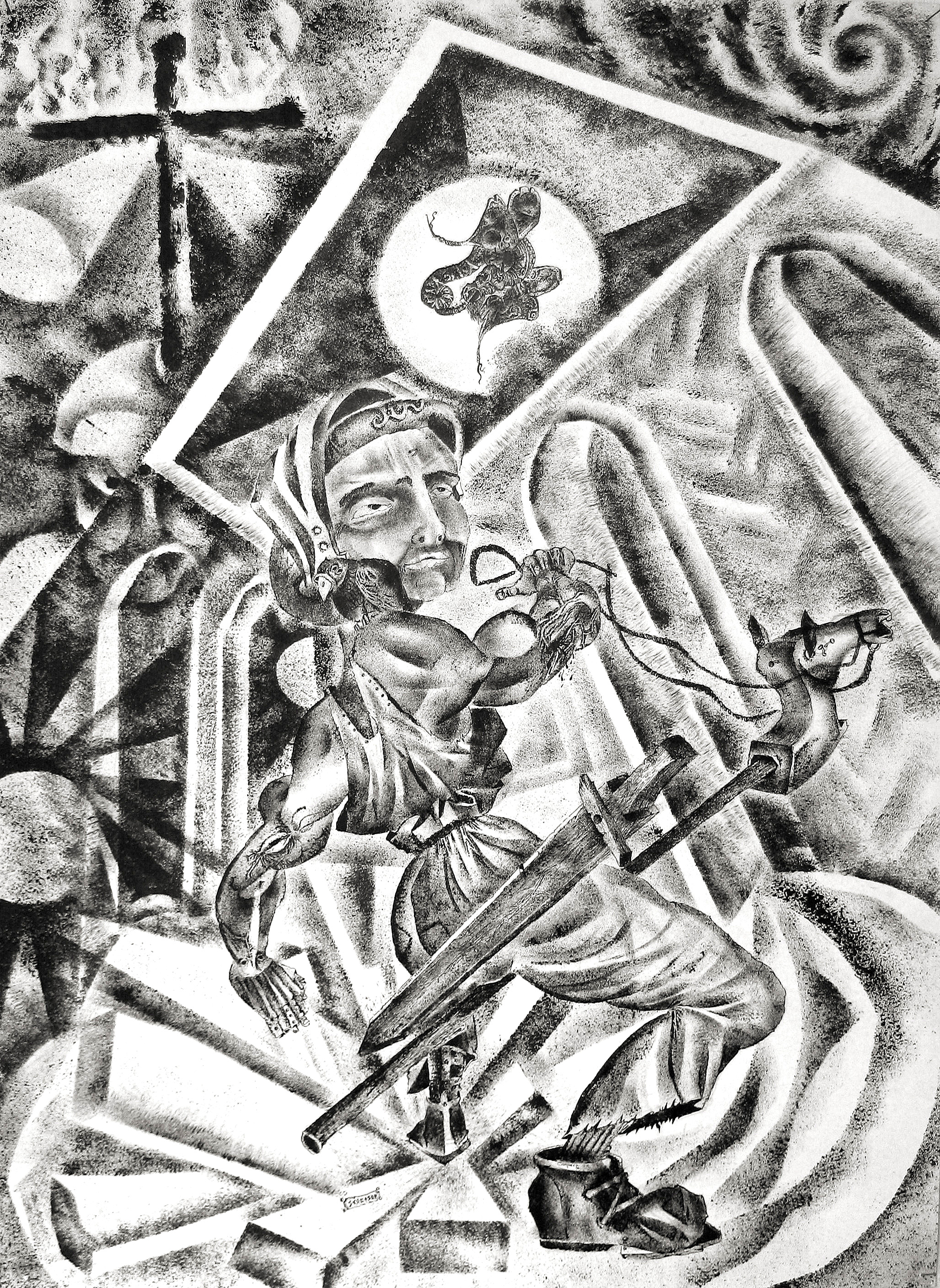
Self Portrait

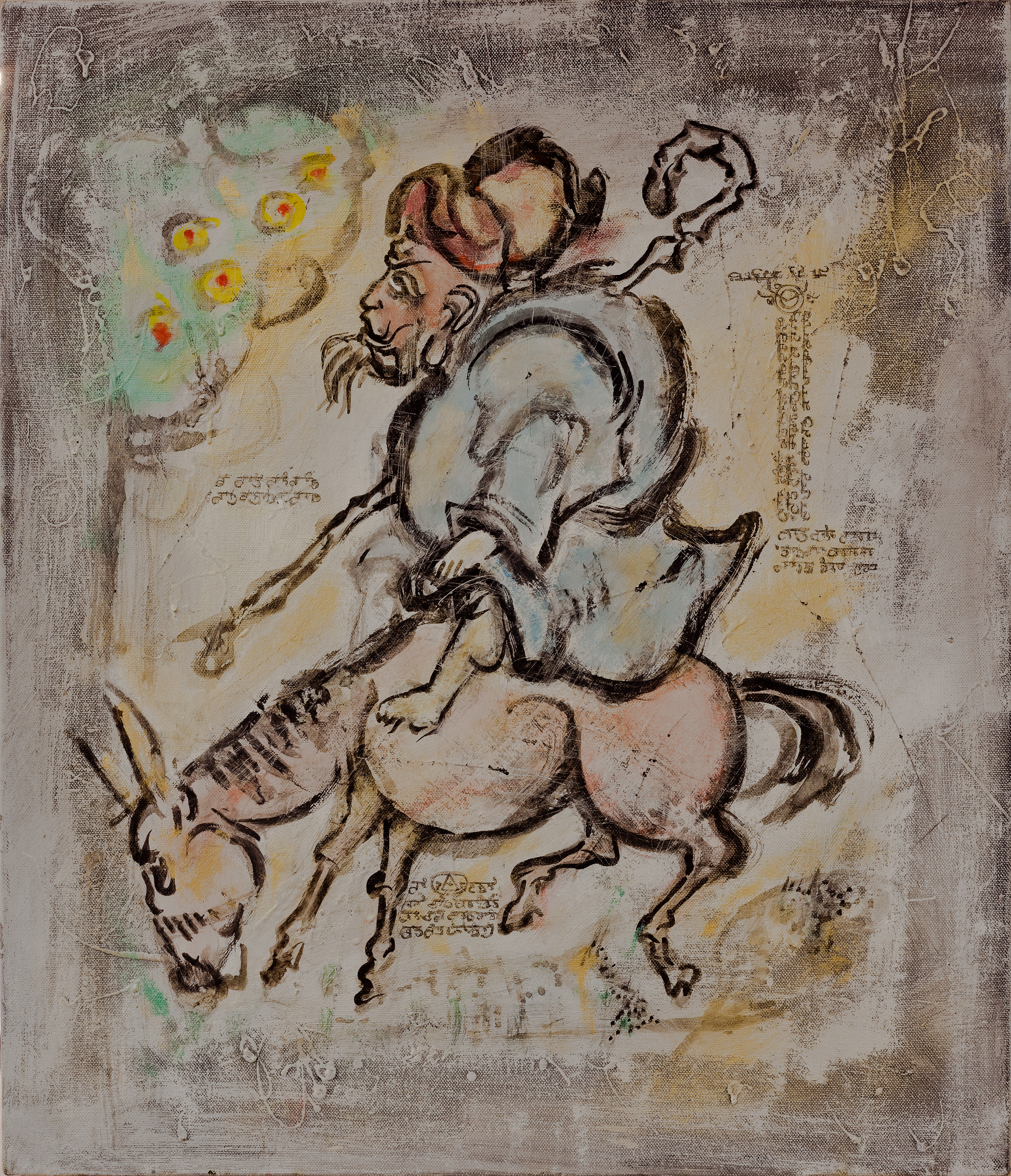
A Sufi Riding a Donkey

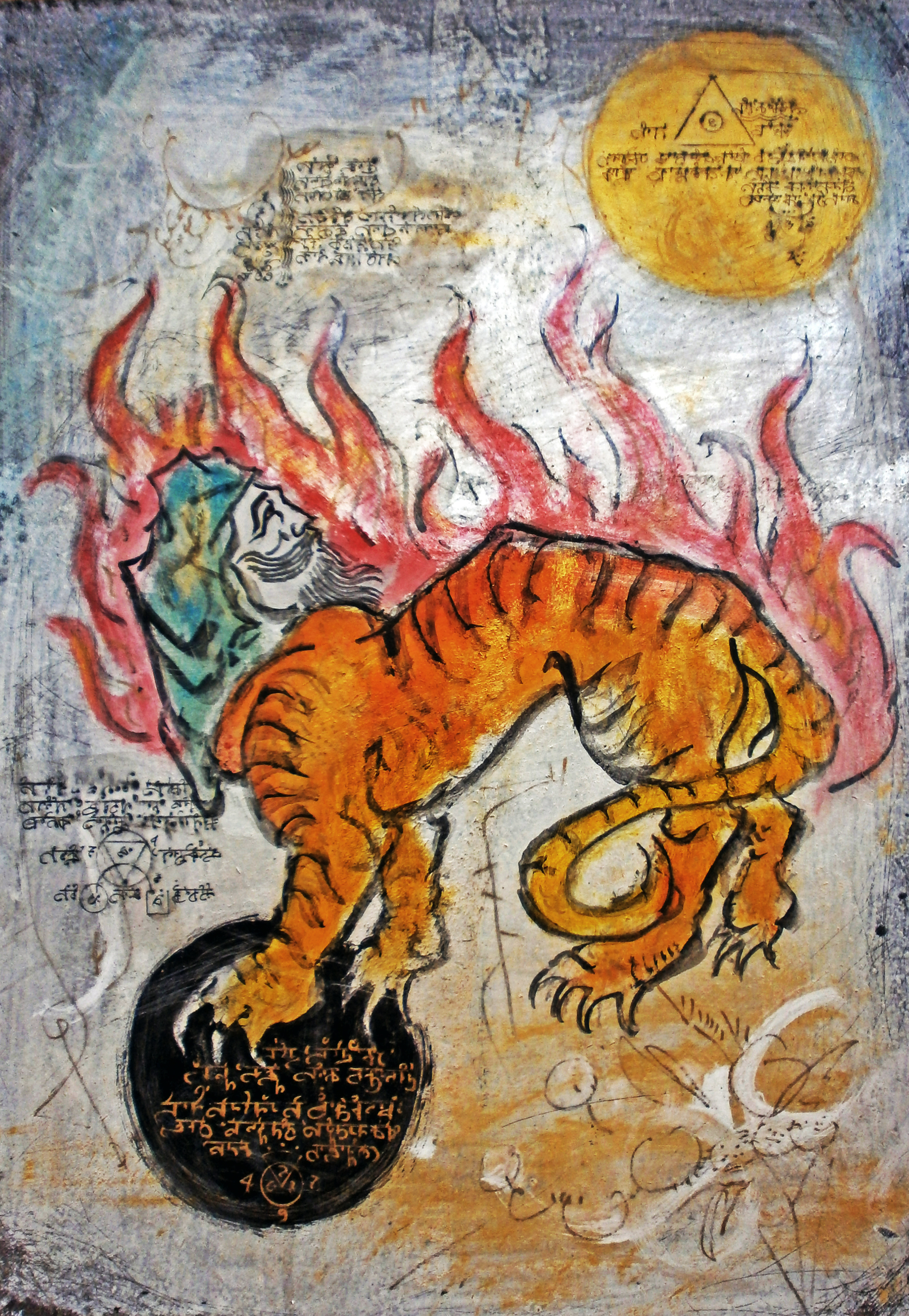
A Master Who Had Conquered a Lion Within Himself Became a Fire Lion

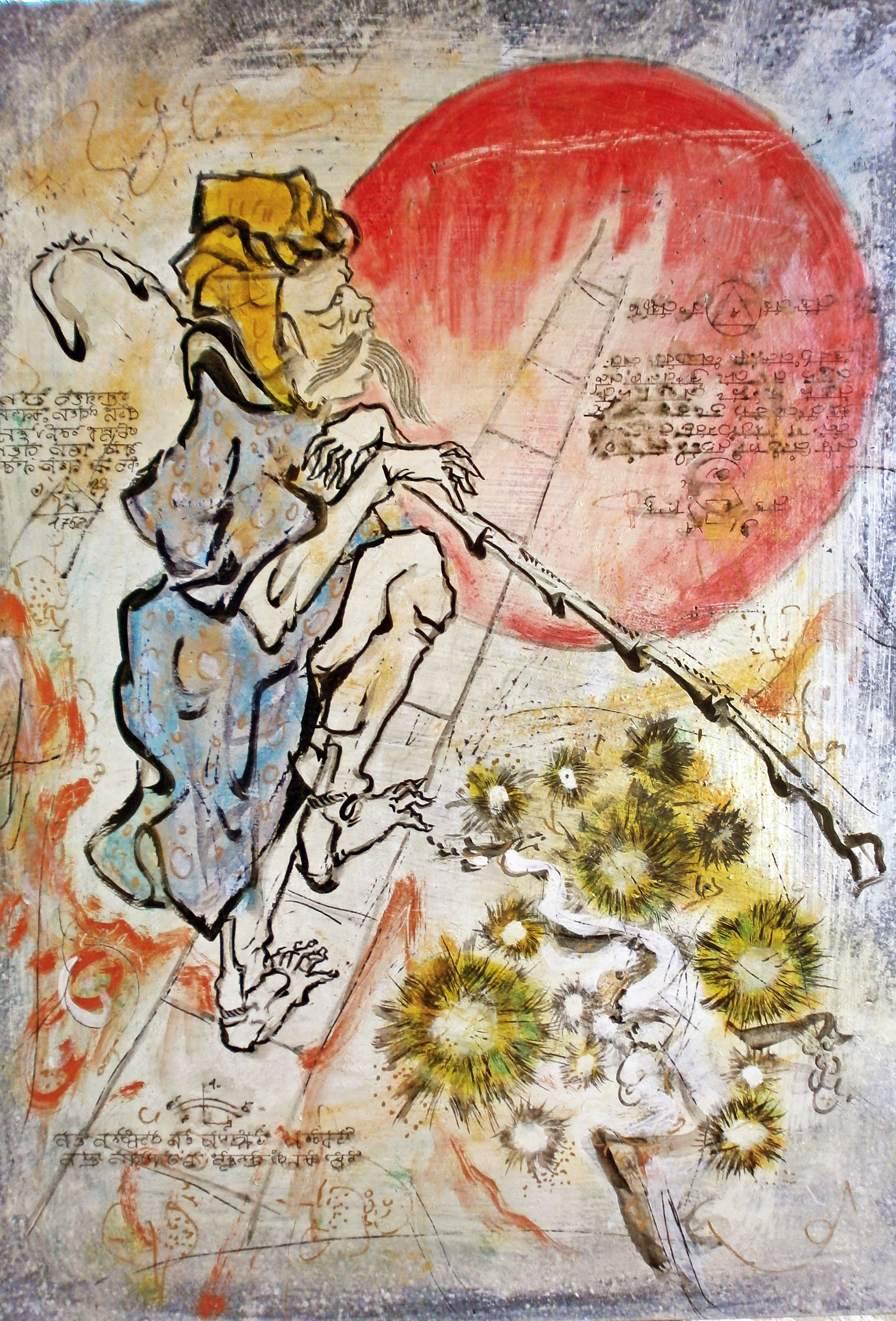
Master and Way of Ascent

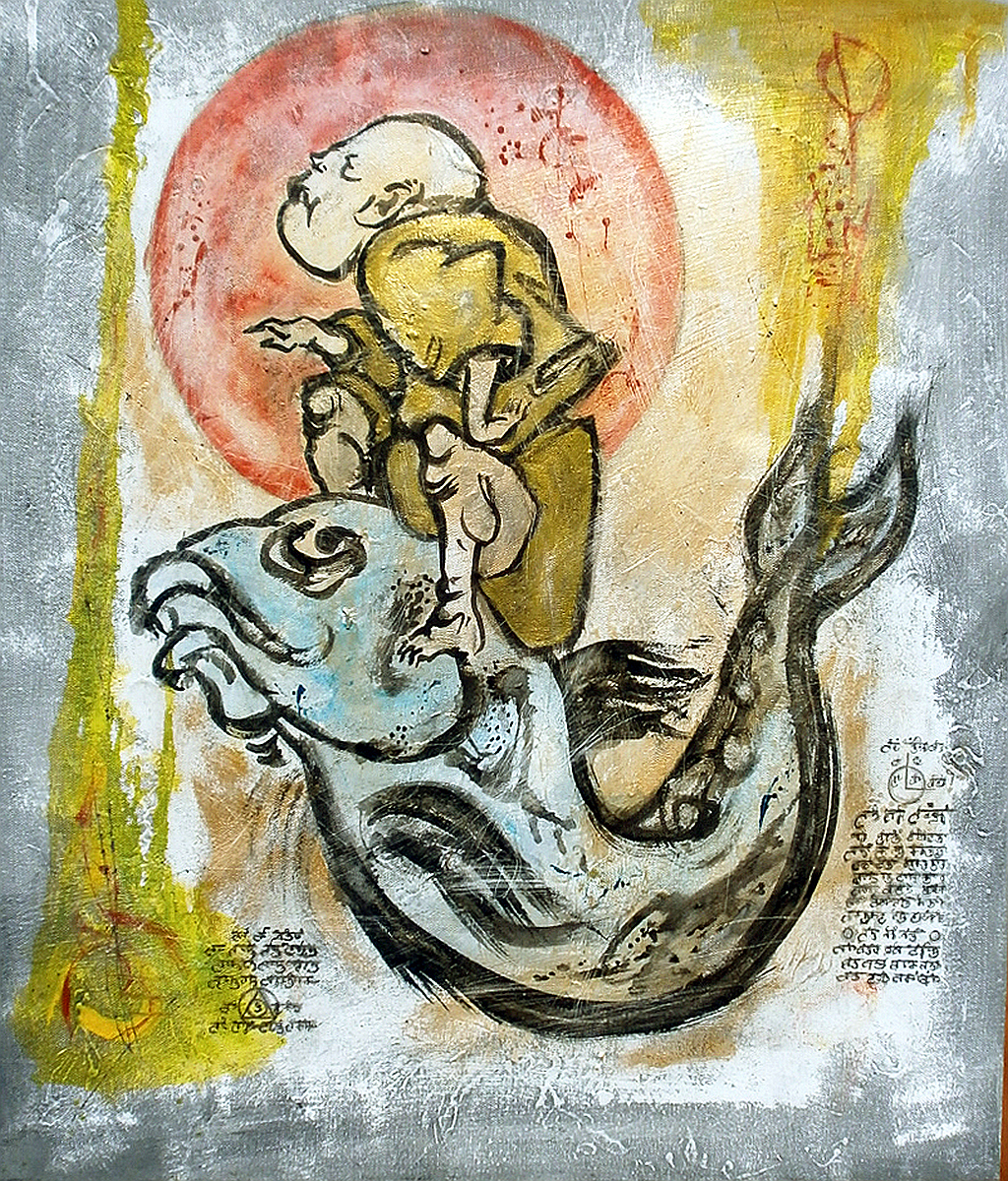
Taoist Understanding Sky

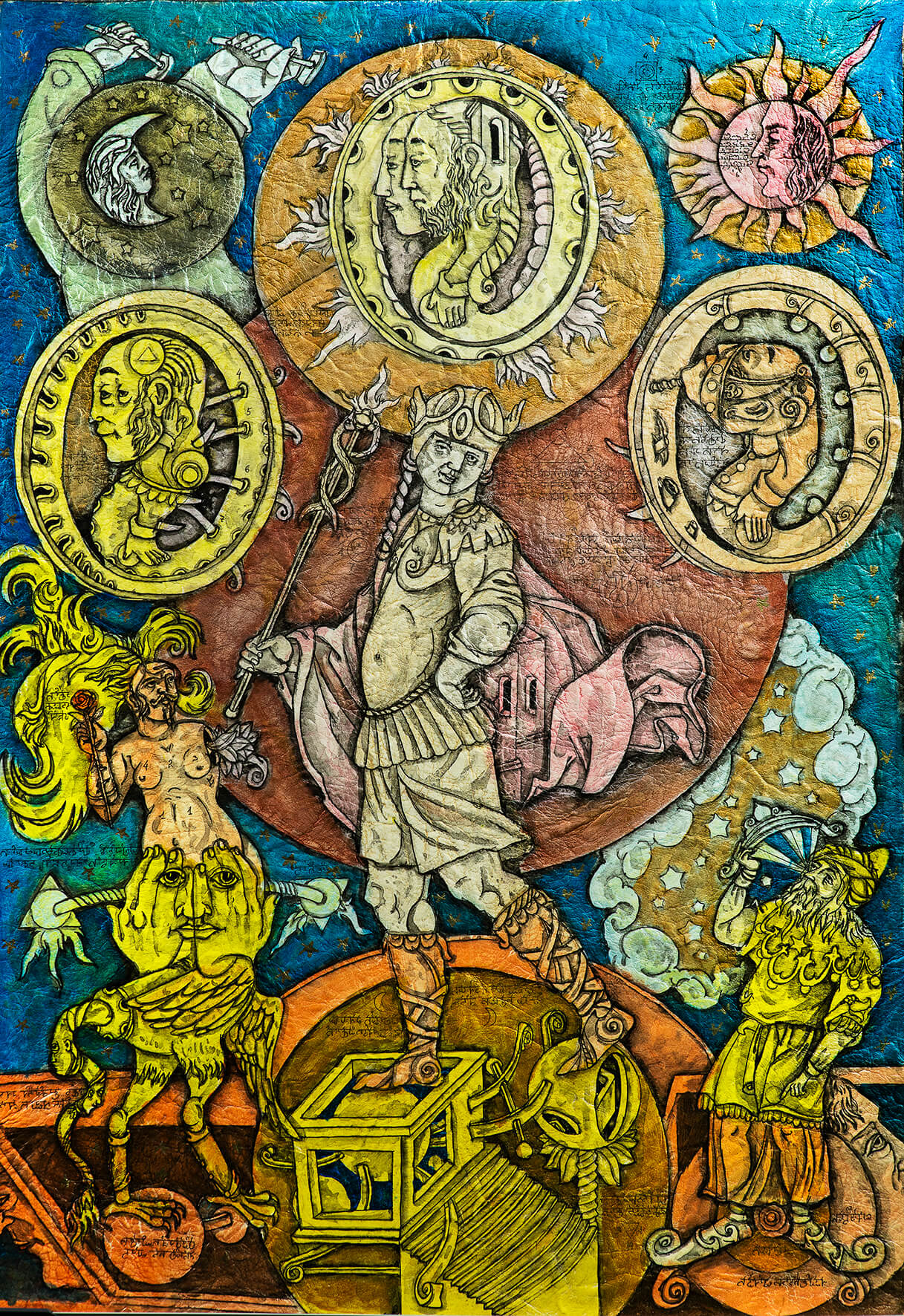
Mercurius ter Maximus

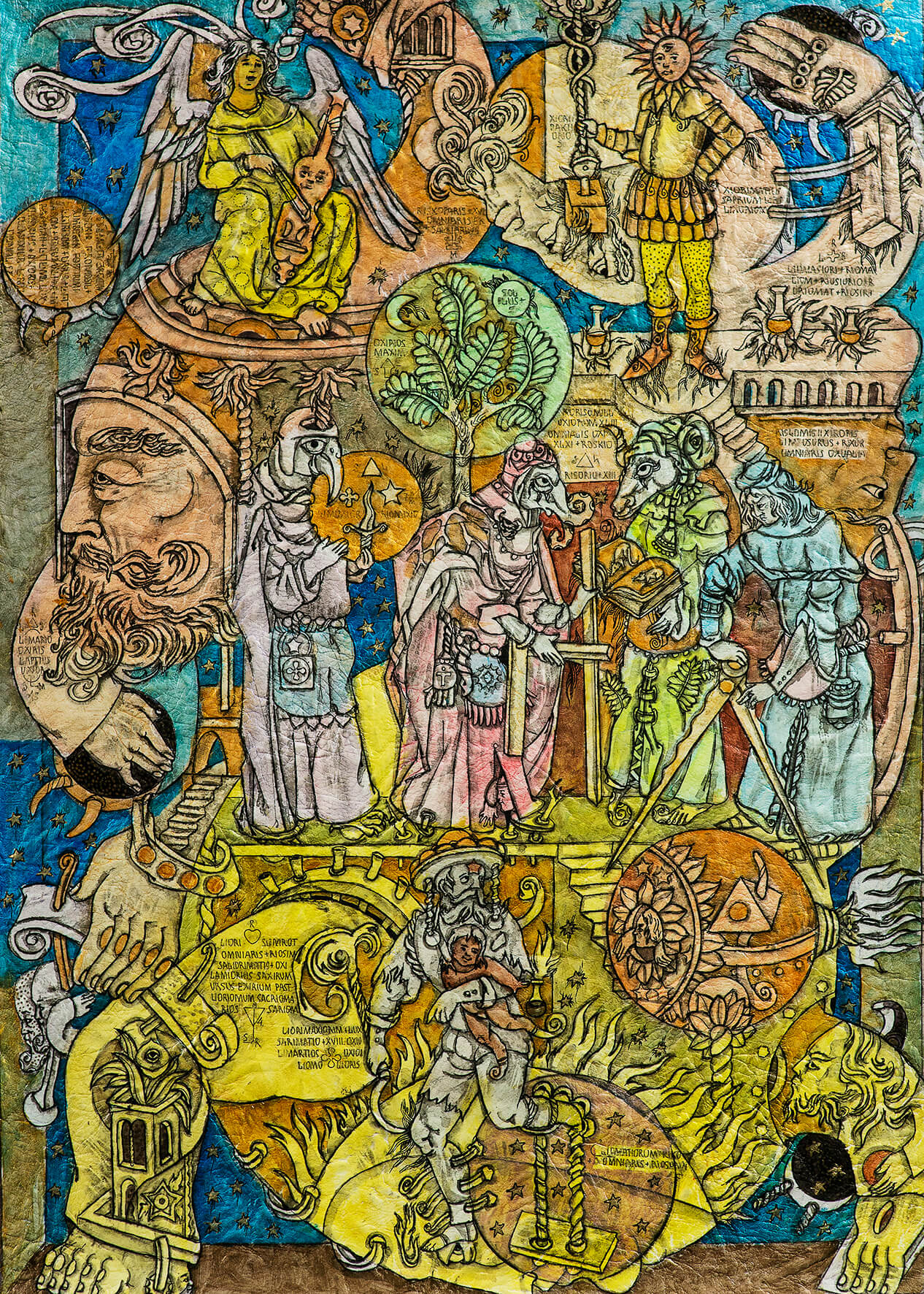
Tablet of Hermes

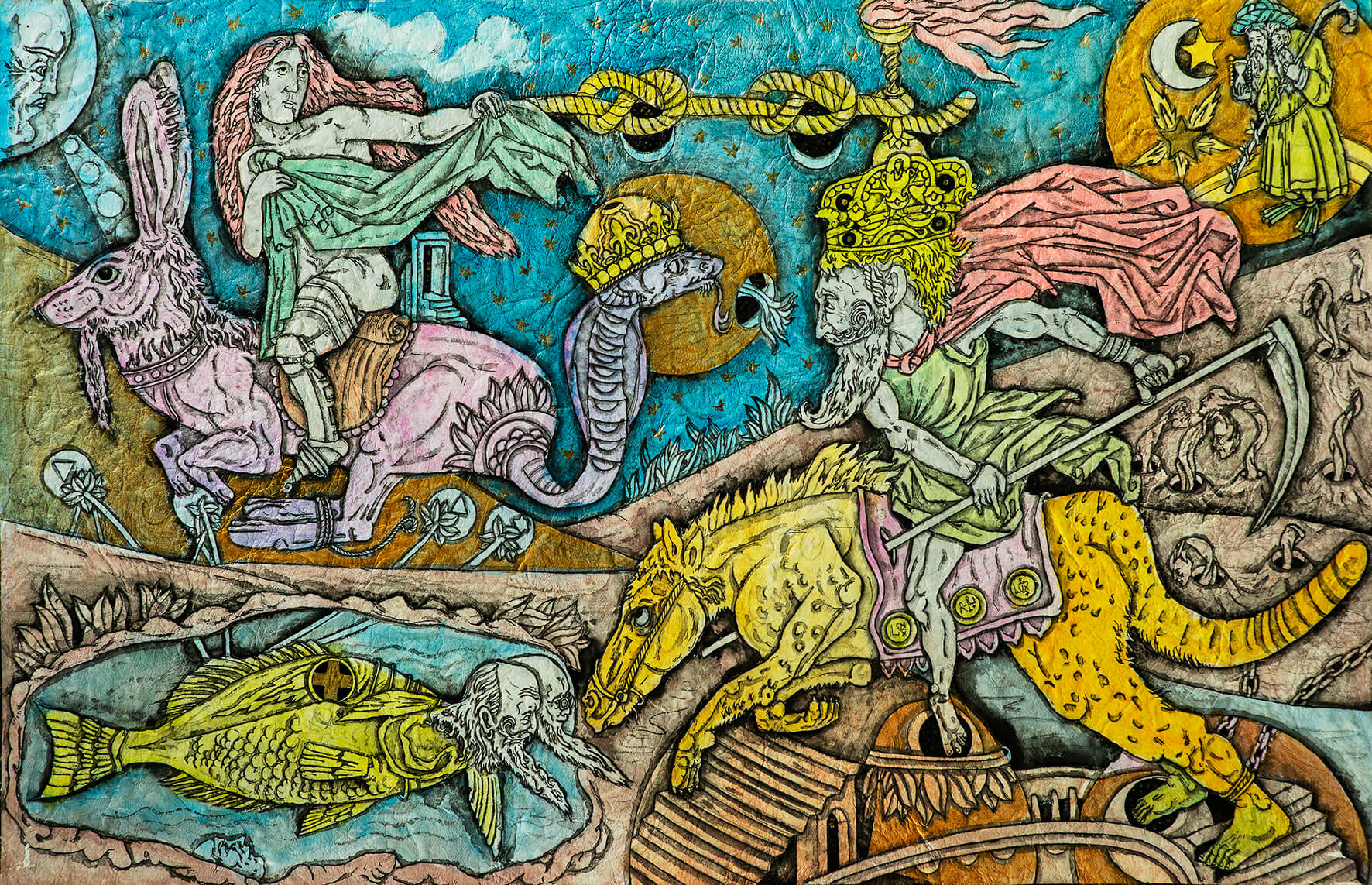
Master of Time

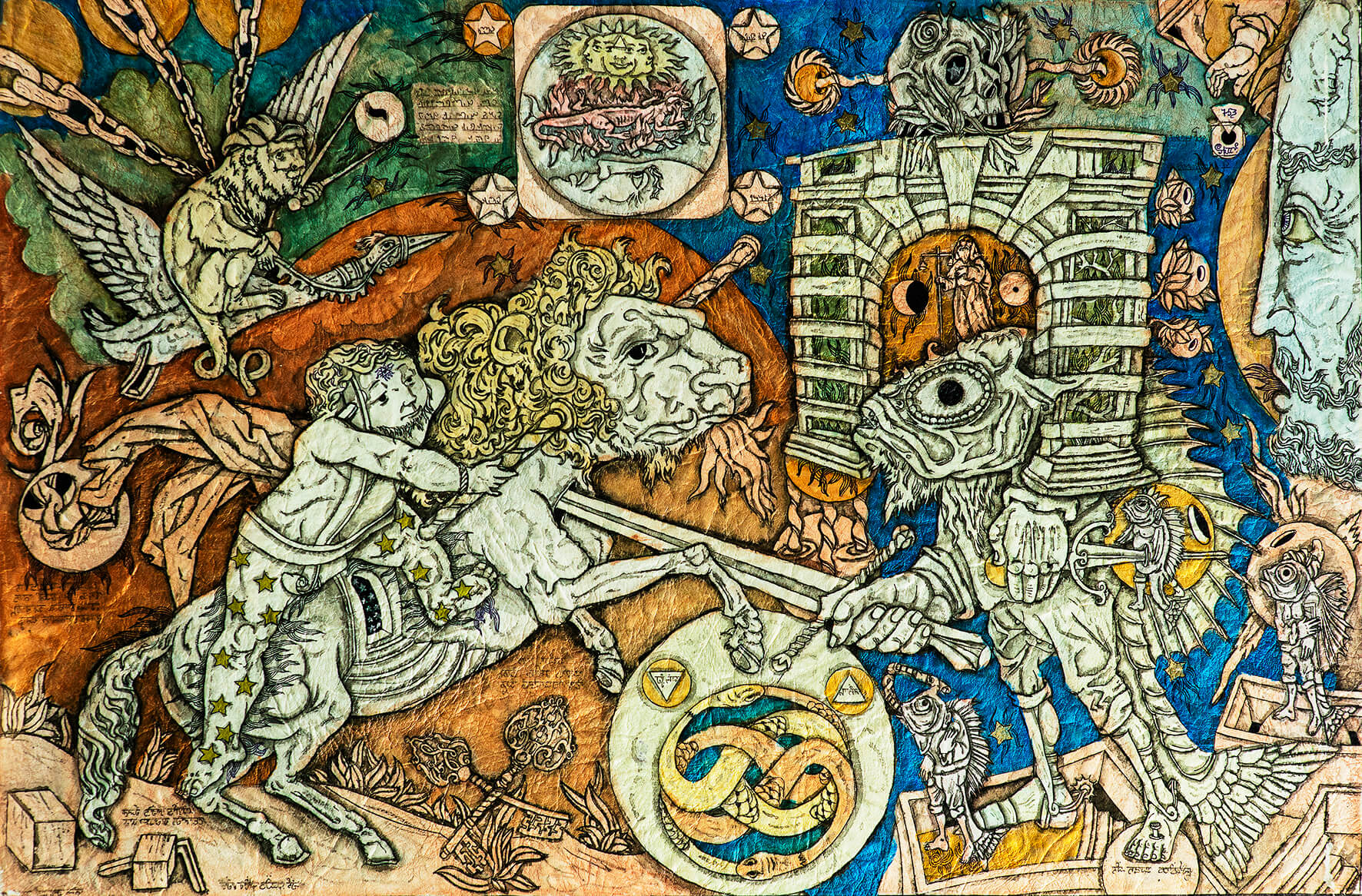
The fight of Lion and a Fish

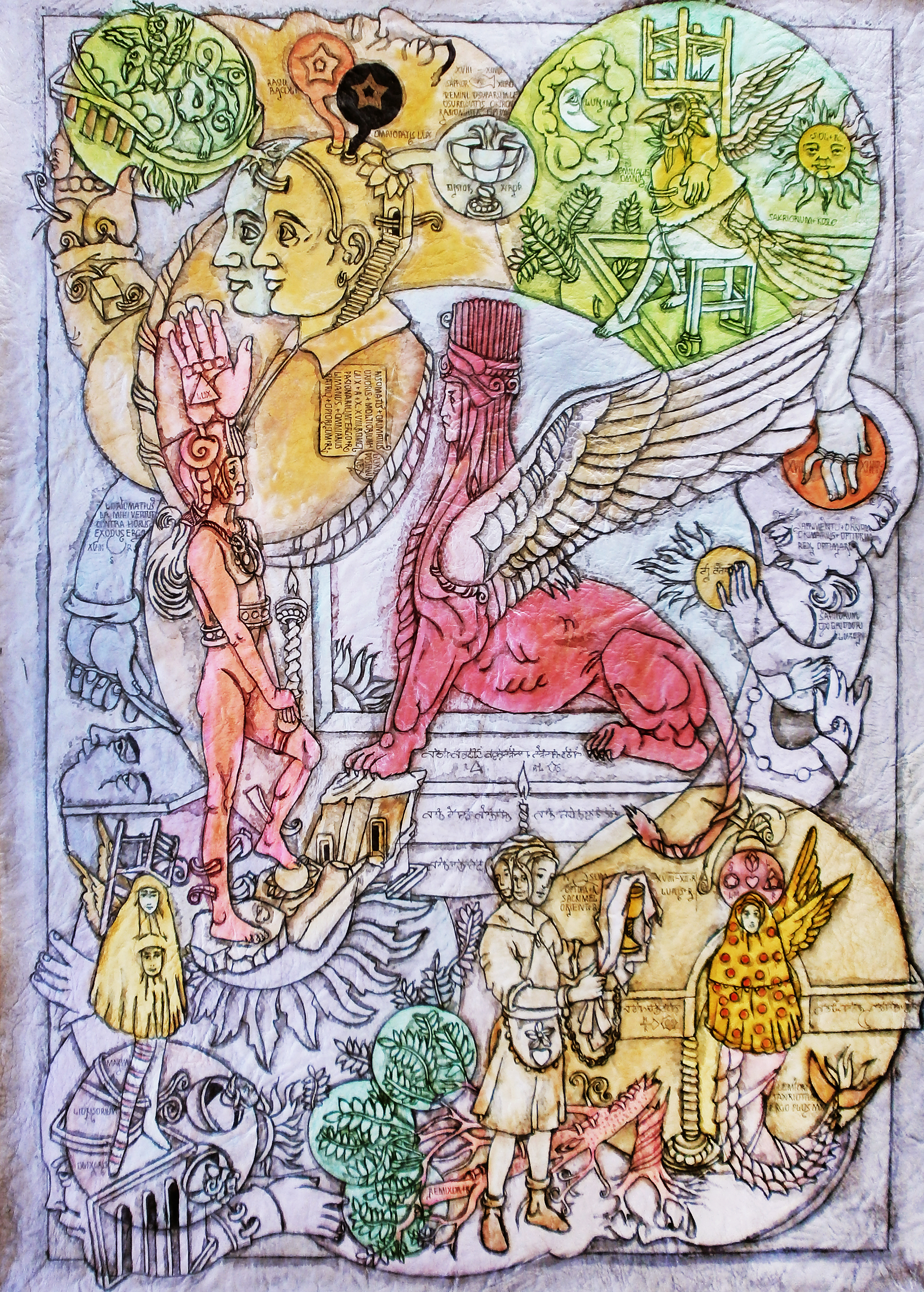
Mysteries of the Sphinx

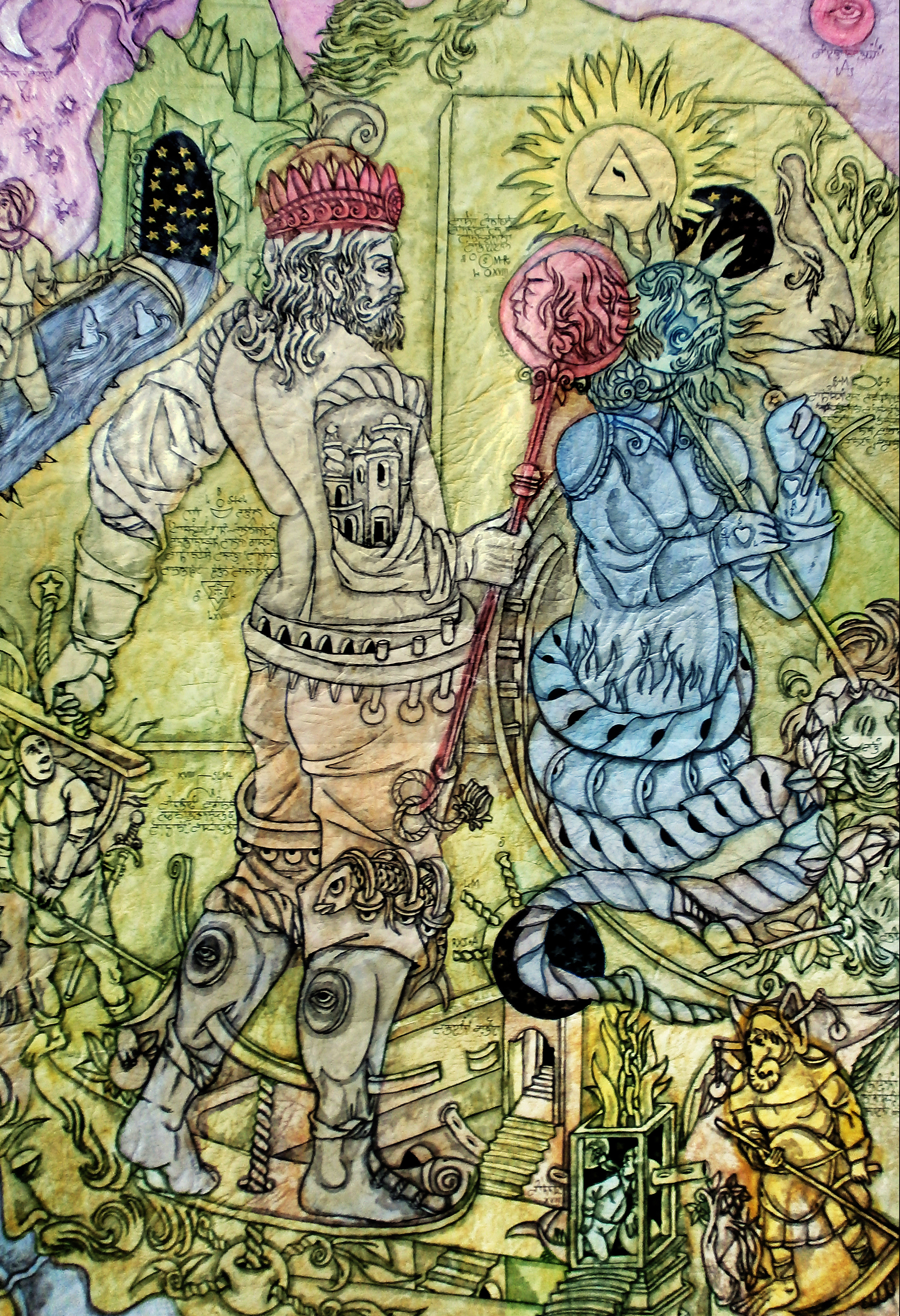
Prima Materia of the Philosophers Stone

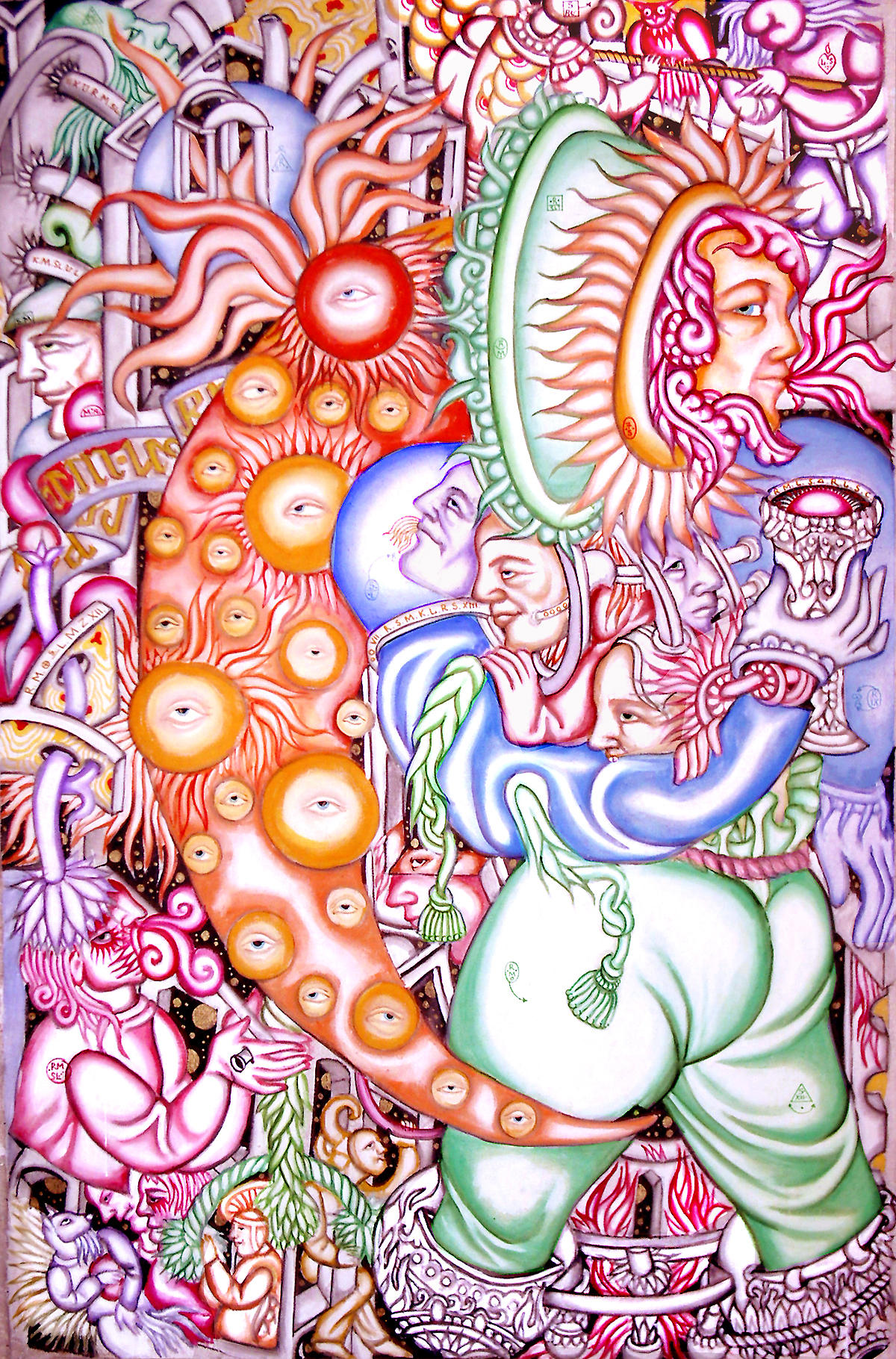
The Book of Secret of the Sun, series Prospero's Books

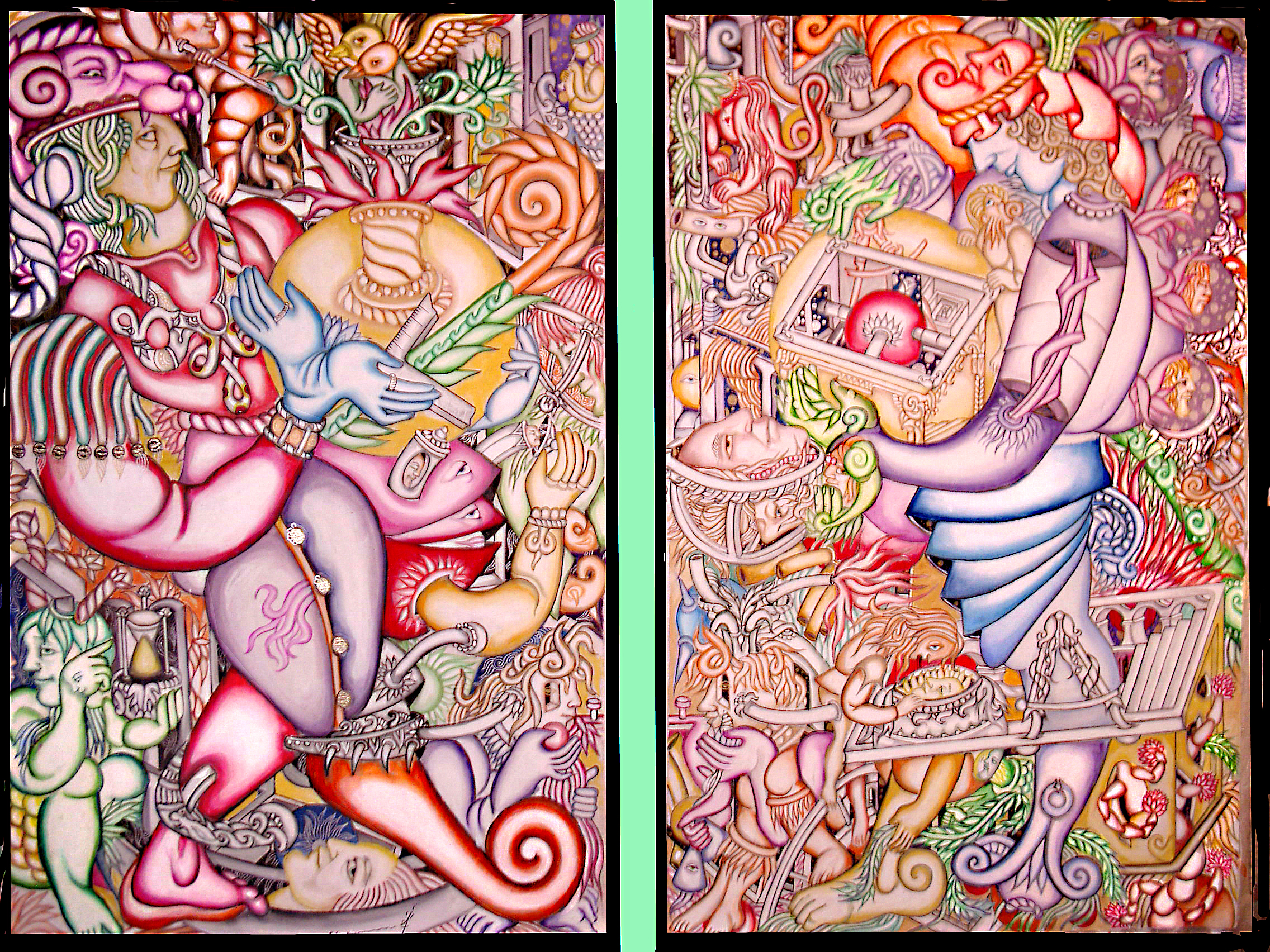
Diptych The Book of Measurements and Proportions, series Prospero's Books

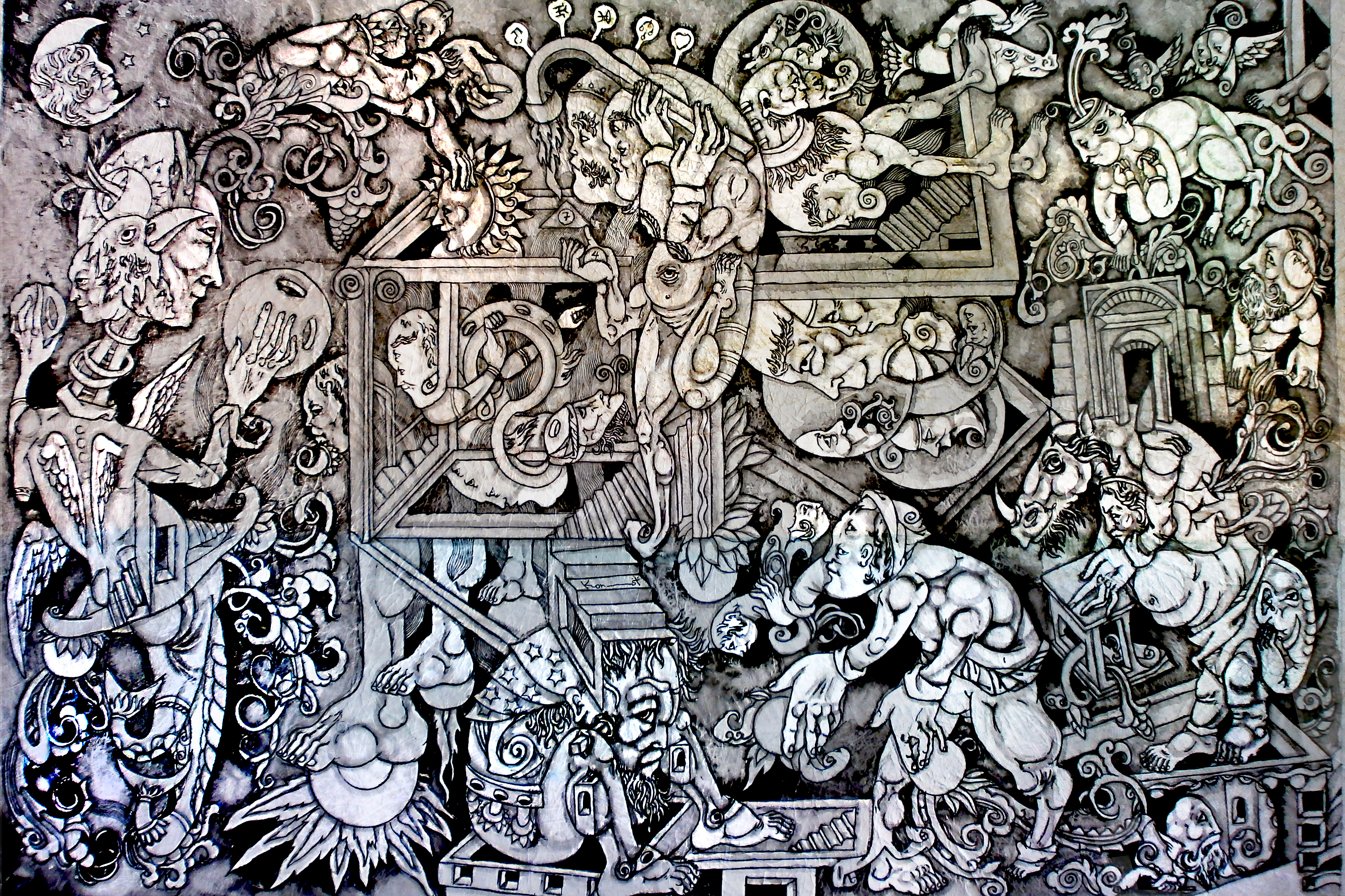
Prophesy

== Achievements and awards ==
- A registered member of Professional Artist Union of Russian Federation.
- Representative of Paris School of Ukrainian Painting in Odesa, founded by Temistokl Vyrsta.
- Representative of Art-Association Fenix, Paris.
- Founder of Semantic Realism art style.
- Honorary Fellow of Russian-Italian Academy Ferrony.
- Fellowship at Nouvelle Academie Libre (Paris).
- Member of Art-Club Ekaterinenskaya Square, Moscow.
- Recipient of Ordre souverain militaire hospitalier de Saint-Jean, de Jérusalem, de Rhodes et de Malte award for Achievements in Art.
- Finalist of Ukrainian Rating Project Top 100 Pride of Ukraine: Men.

== Solo and group exhibitions ==
- 1986 – Participant, Group Exhibition Salon of Association of Galleries of Taiwan and Hong Kong.
- 1989 – Participant, Group Exhibition City Dreams, State Literary Museum, Odesa, Ukraine.
- 1990 – Participant, Group Exhibition Mystic Art, Odesa Museum of History and Ethnography, Odesa, Ukraine.
- 1991 – Solo Exhibition, Museum of Anastasia and Marina Tsvetaevy, Alexandrov, Russia.
- 1991 – Solo Exhibition. Osuuskuntamuotoinen nettigalleria. Suomeksi, Finland.
- 1992 – Art Installation Silence, Group Art Visual and Musical Installation, with elements of Choreography: Kamil Chalaev (France), Sabine Jame (France), Konstantin Skoptsov (Ukraine). Odesa Art Museum, Odesa, Ukraine.
- 1992 — Solo Exhibition. Taidegalleria Hämeenlinnassa, Turku, Finland.
- 1992 — Solo Exhibition. Cazots art gallery, Copenhagen, Denmark.
- 1993 – Solo Exhibition. Krymski Val Gallery, Central House of Artist, Moscow, Russia.
- 1993 – 1993 Participant, Group Exhibition Russian Art. Drawing (M. Chemiakin, А. Zverev, V. Yakovlev, О. Rabin, L. Krapivnicki, К. Skoptsov.). Krymski Val Gallery, Central House of Artist, Moscow, Russia.
- 1993 – Participant, Group Exhibition of Artists-Illustrators. State Literary Museum, Moscow, Russia.
- 1994 – Participant, Group Exhibition Silver Soul of Odesa, TASS Gallery, Moscow, Russia.
- 1995 – Konstantin Skoptsov, Solo Exhibition. Odesa Art Museum, Odesa, Ukraine.
- 1995 – Solo Exhibition. Art association Le Fenix, Paris, France.
- 1998 – Participant, Group Art Project I See a Ship, Space Gallery, Moscow, Russia.
- 1999 – Participant, Group Exhibition. Manezh—Art-Aqua, Moscow, Russia.
- 1999 – Participant, Group Exhibition Where the Light moves, Irena Gallery, Kyiv, Ukraine.
- 2000 – Participant, Group Illustrations Exposition for Museum of Anastasia and Marina Tsvetaevy, Alexandrov, Russia – Traveling Exposition.
- 2000 – Solo Exhibition. Nouvelle Academie Libre, Paris, France.
- 2004 – Solo Exhibition. An Invitation to travel. Art-Club "Ekaterininskaya Square", Моscow, Russia.
- 2005 – Participant Paris School of Ukrainian Painting – 2005, Art association Le Fenix Gallery, Paris. France.
- 2007 – Solo Exhibition Prospero's Books. Anthony Brunelli Fine Arts Gallery, Binghamton, USA.
- 2009 – Solo Exhibition "aTTesting to Dreams", Museum of Ideas Gallery, Lviv, Ukraine.
- 2012 – Solo Exhibition dedicated to Art Festival Life after Euro, Juzovski Passazh, Donetsk, Ukraine.
- 2012 – Solo Exhibition Contre-Illusions. Gallery of Contemporary Art NT-Art, Odesa, Ukraine.
- 2013 – Solo Exhibition Within Exposition Themed: Odesa Art School. Traditional and Current Art, Art-Donbass Museum, Donetsk, Ukraine. Project Co-Founder.
- 2013 – Solo Exhibition within Exposition Themed Odesa Art School. Traditional and Current Art, National Museum of Art and Culture Mistecki Arsenal, Kyiv, Ukraine.
- 2013 – Solo Exhibition Metamorphosis. Gallery of Contemporary Art NT-Art, Odesa, Ukraine.
- 2014 – Participant, Group Exhibition Semantic Surrealism, Art-Residence House of Mechanic, Donetsk, Ukraine.
- 2014 – Solo Exhibition in the Center of Circle, Dymchuk Gallery, Kyiv, Ukraine.
- 2014 – Solo Exhibition in the Center of Circle, Gallery of Contemporary Art NT-Art, Odesa, Ukraine.
- 2015 – Solo Exhibition. Konstantin Skoptsov. Chamber of Commerce of Ukraine, Kyiv, Ukraine.
- 2016 – Participant and Co-Founder Sacred Geometry Art Project (Konstantin Skoptsov, Vadim Bondero), Gallery of Contemporary Art NT-Art, Odesa, Ukraine.
- 2018 – Solo Exhibition. Permanent Exposition: Path of the Symbol, Exposition within Wall Street Business Center, Odesa, Ukraine.
- 2020 – Solo Exhibition Parables of Masters Museum of Ideas Gallery, Lviv, Ukraine.
- 2020 – Participant, Group Exhibition Dreams of Gogol, gallery #ArtOdesa at the Summer Theater in city garden, Odesa, Ukraine.
- 2021 — Solo Exhibition New Millenium, Exposition within Wall Street Business Center, Odesa, Ukraine.
