= Odesa city garden =

Garden in Odesa, Ukraine

- Міський сад
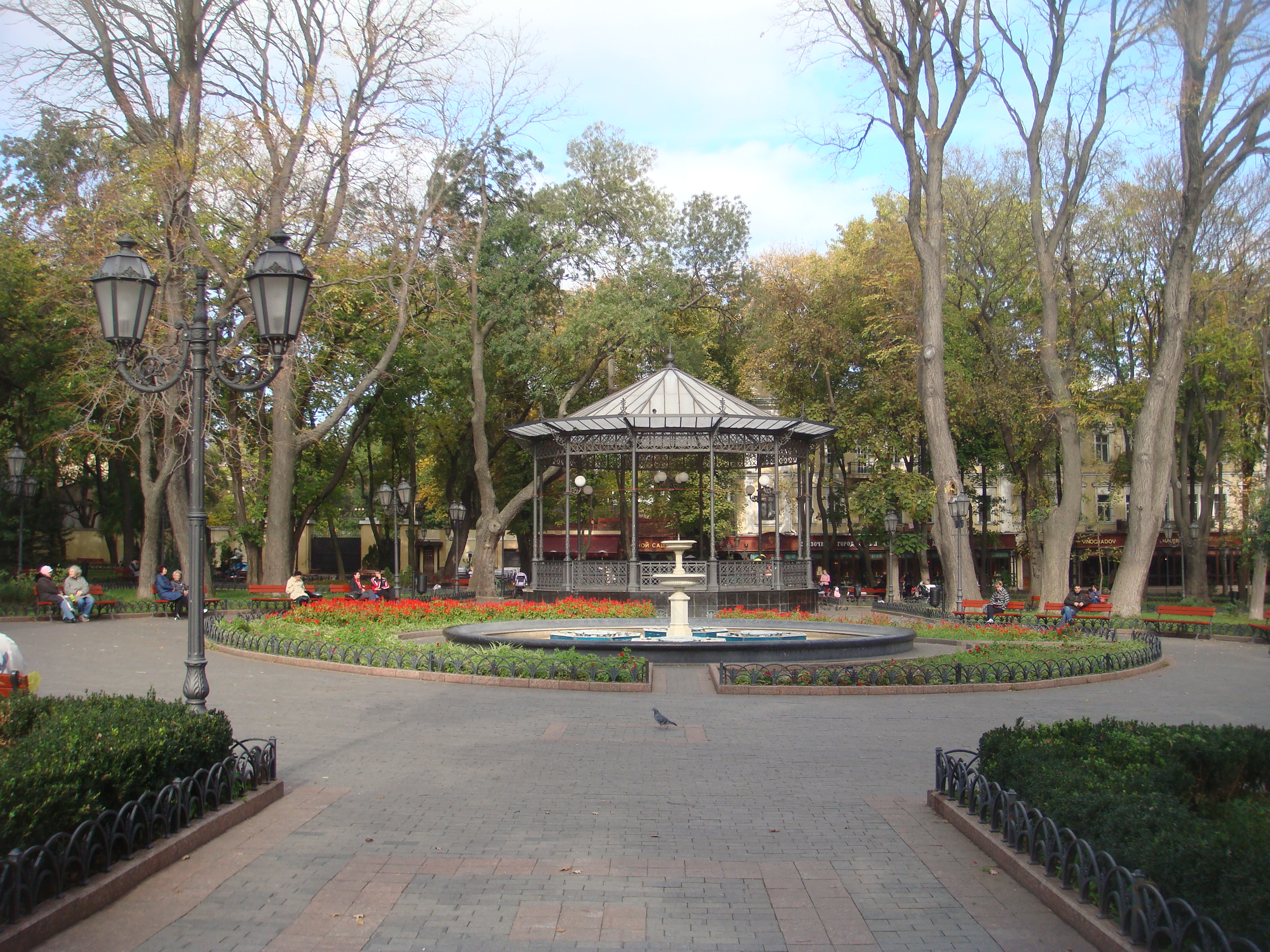
- Interactive map of Odesa city garden
- Type: City garden
- Location: Derybasivska Street, Odesa
- Coordinates: 46°29′05″N 30°44′06″E
- Area: 1.86 hectares (4.6 acres)
- Created: 1803

Immovable Monument of Local Significance of Ukraine
- Official name: Міський сад (City garden)
- Type: Garden and Park Art
- Reference no.: 232-Од

The Odesa City garden (Ukrainian: Міський сад, romanized: Miskyi sad) is located in town centre of Odesa, Ukraine, at the Derybasivska Street. Founded by Felix de Ribas (brother of José de Ribas) in 1803, it is the oldest park in the city. Felix de Ribas was an owner of most of this part of the town, but did not have enough resources to sustain the expenditure, and so he donated the territory of the city garden to the city on November 10, 1806.

The garden includes the summer theatre of the Odesa Orchestra, by architect R.A. Vladimirskaya (1949), the pavilion, by architect A.A. Gentsler (1943) and a number of sculptures and monuments.

The last reconstruction took place in 2007, when the pavilion, music fountain, and facades of buildings were renovated.

== Sources ==
- Пилявский В. А. Здания, сооружения, памятники Одессы и их зодчие. – 2-е изд. – Одесса: Optimum, 2010. – 276 с. – ISBN 978-966-344-377-5

== Gallery ==
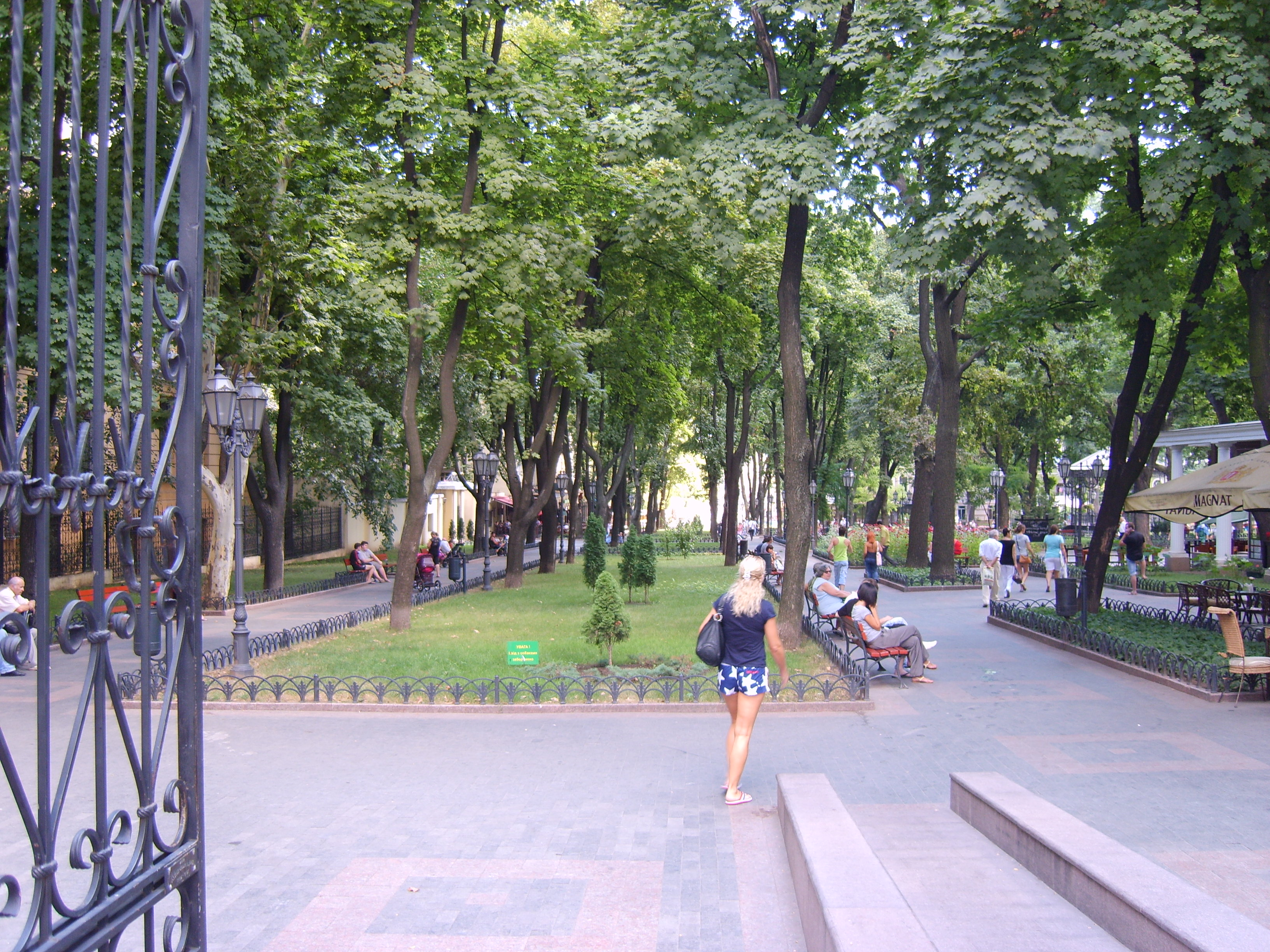
The entrance to the garden from the Preobrazhenska Street

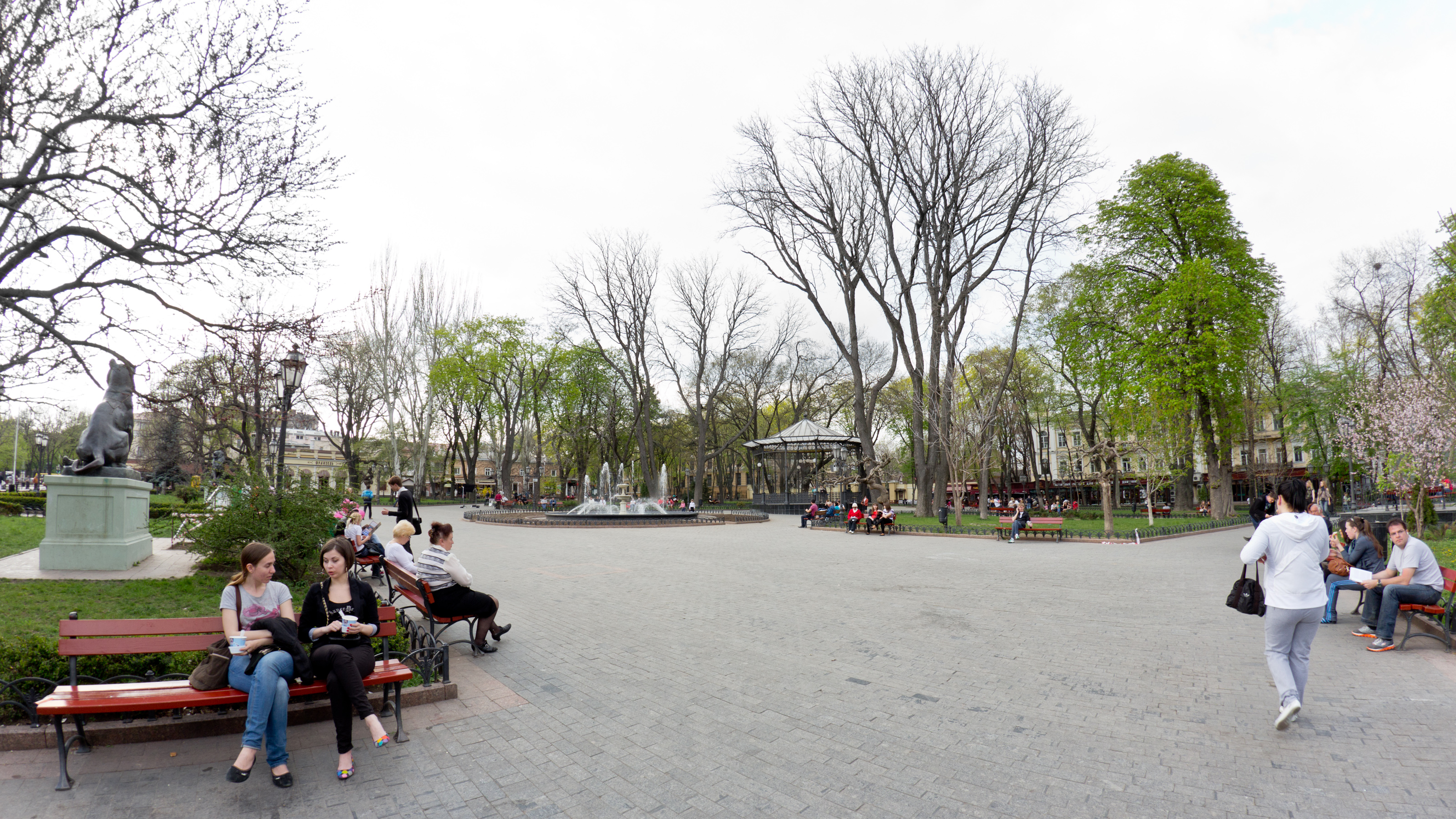
The entrance from the Derybasivska Street

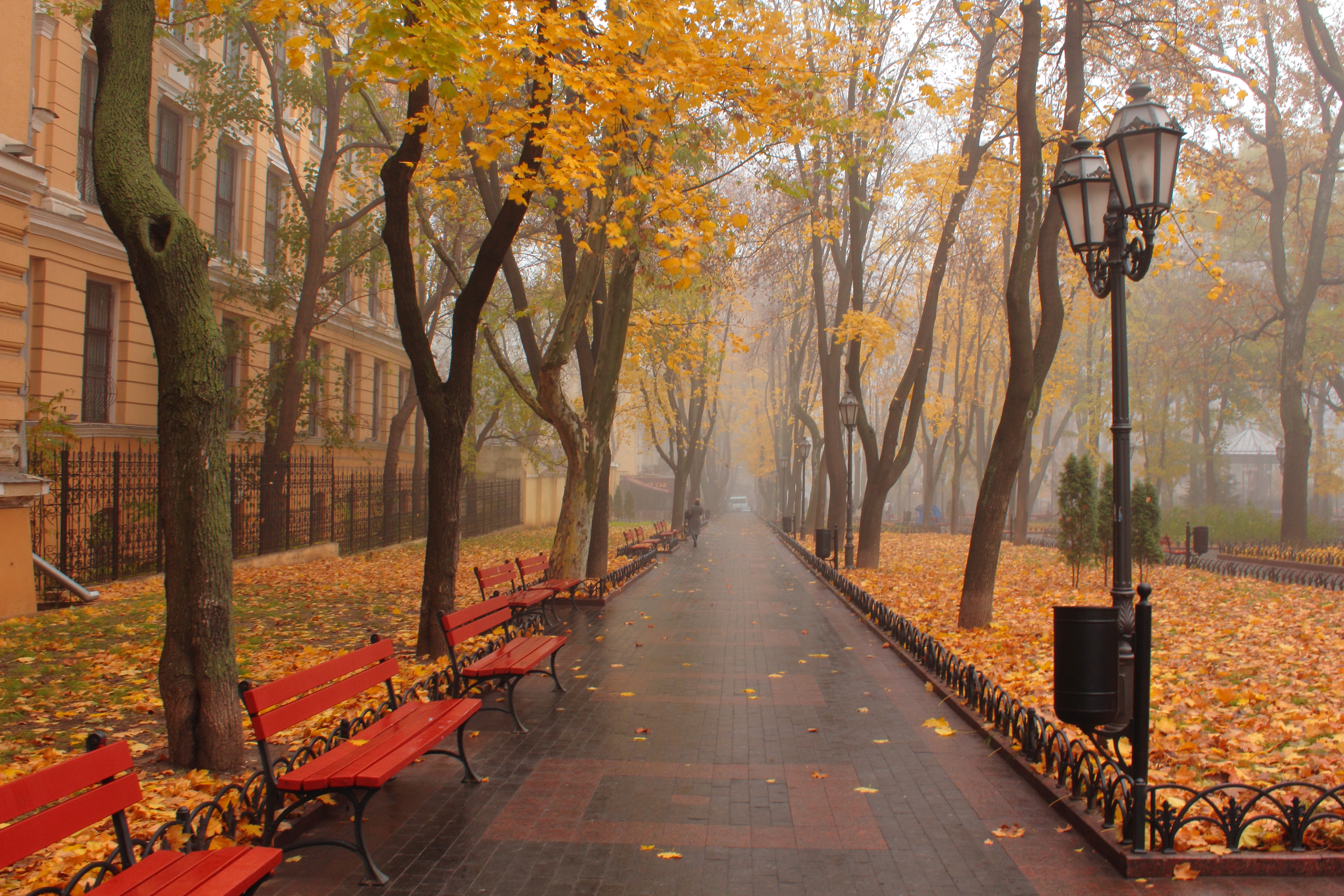
The autumn in the garden

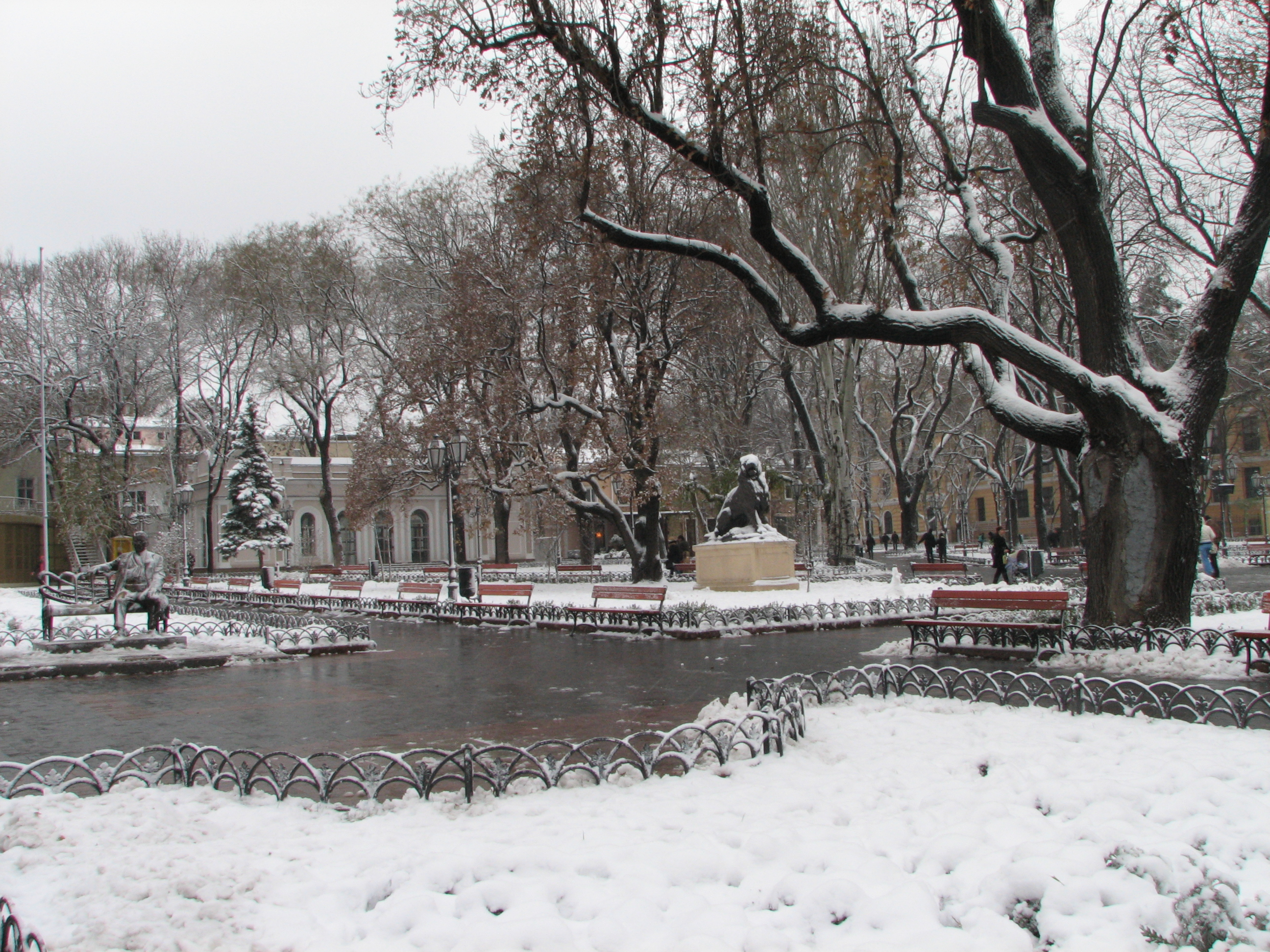
The winter in the garden

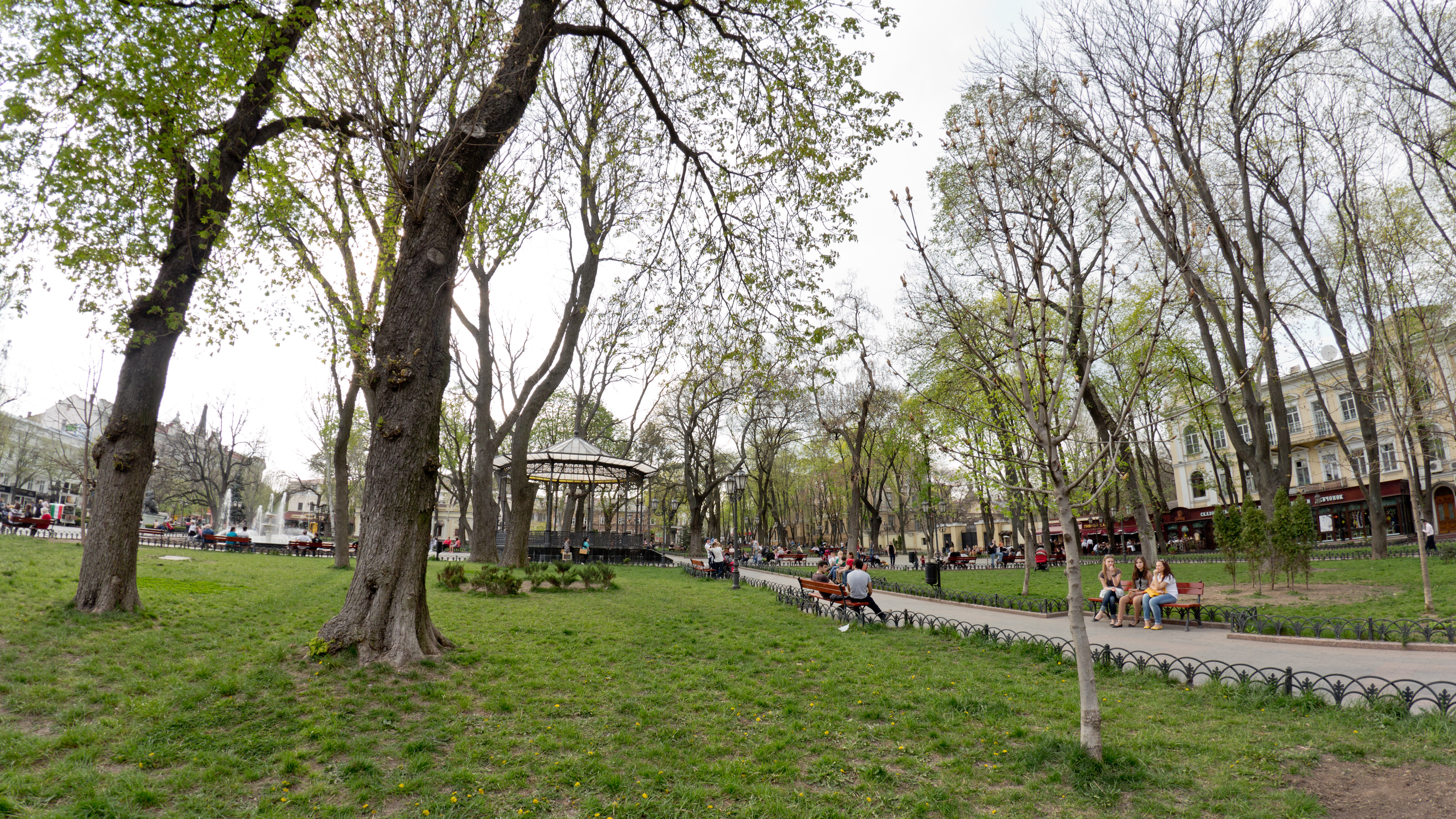
The spring in the garden

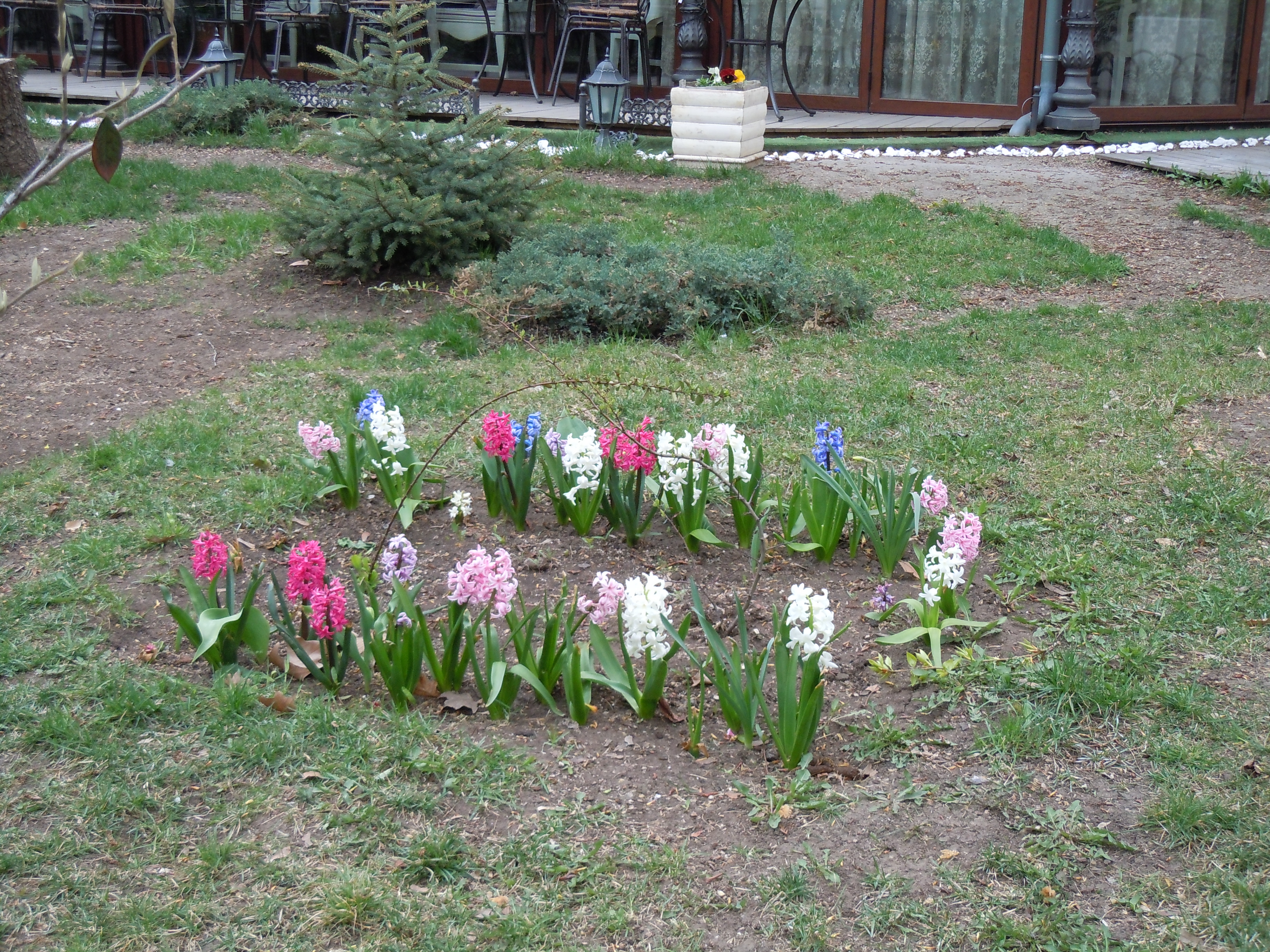
Garden flowers

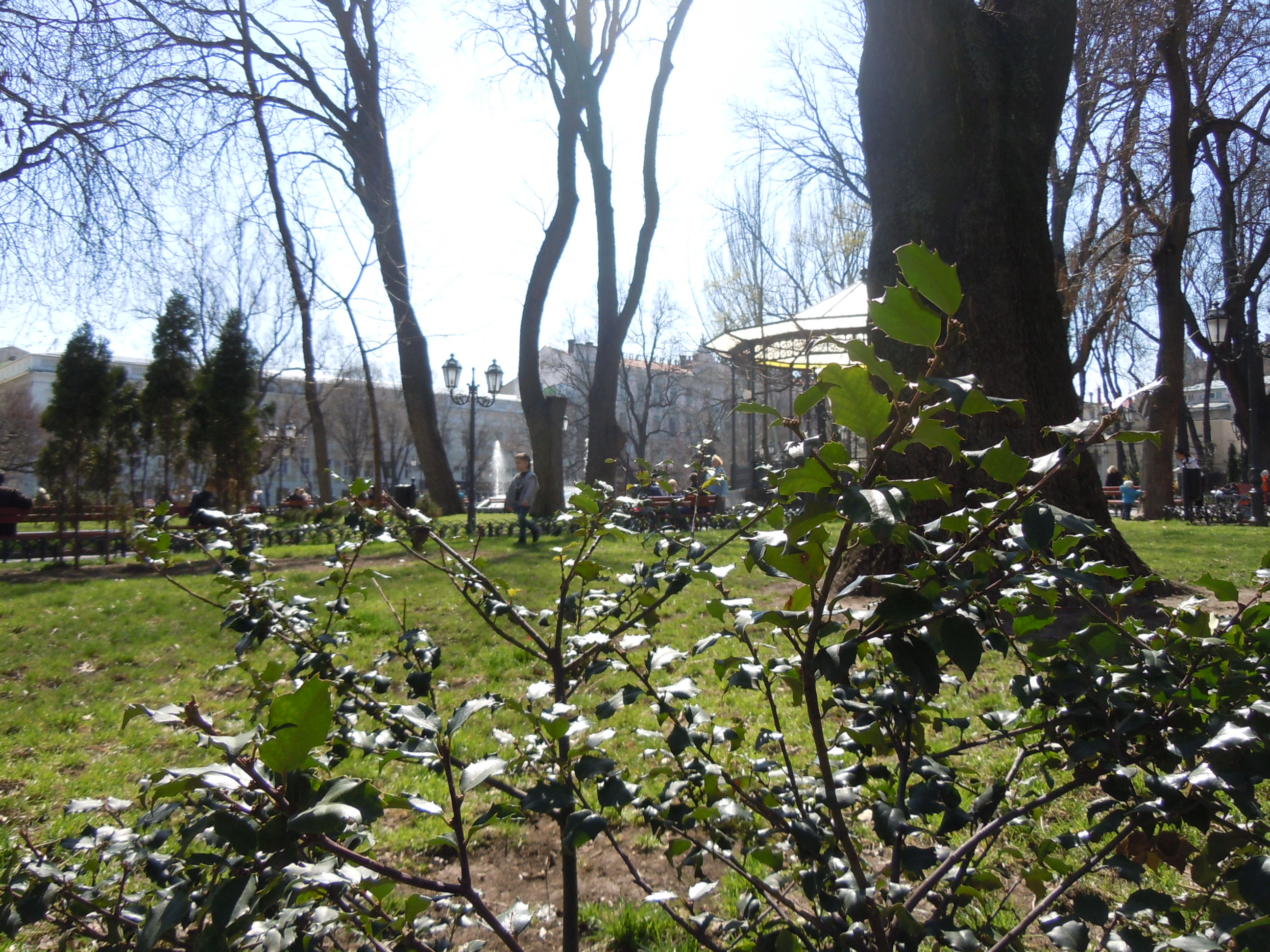
The greenery

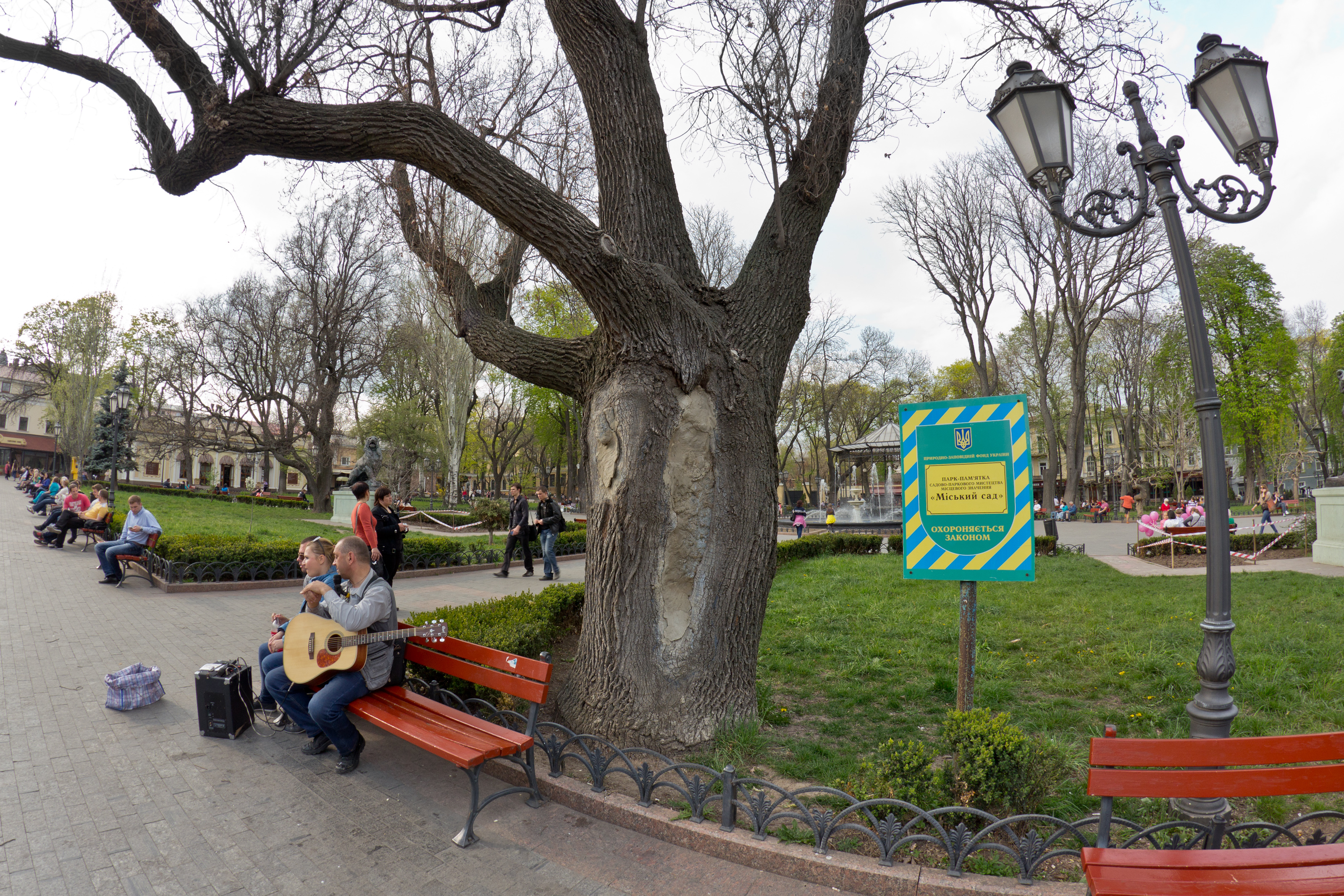
The greenery in the garden

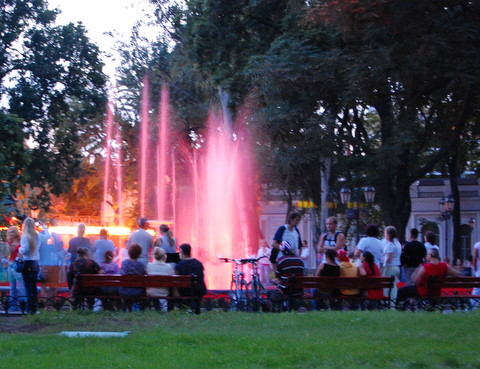
The fountain at evening

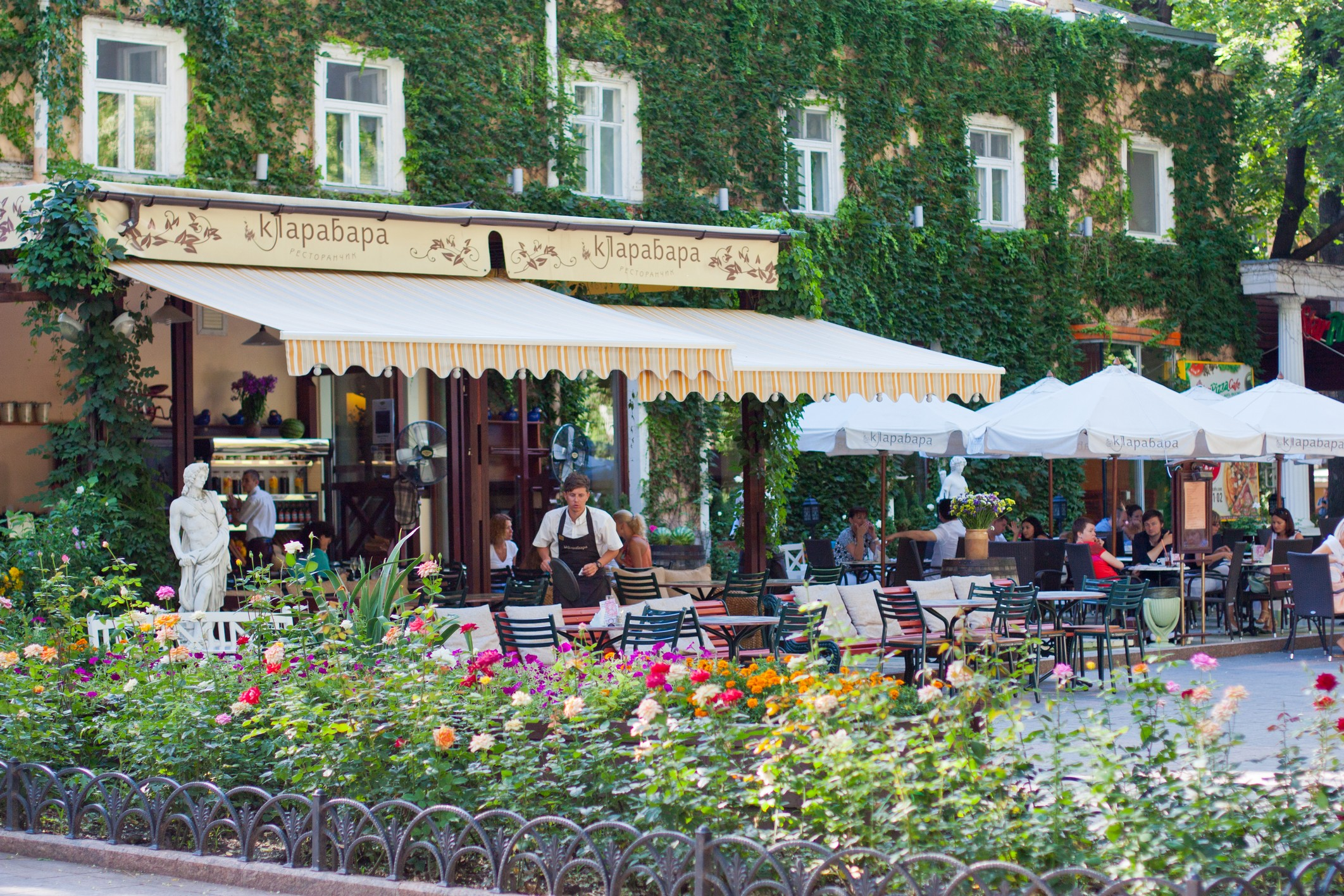
The restaurants in the garden

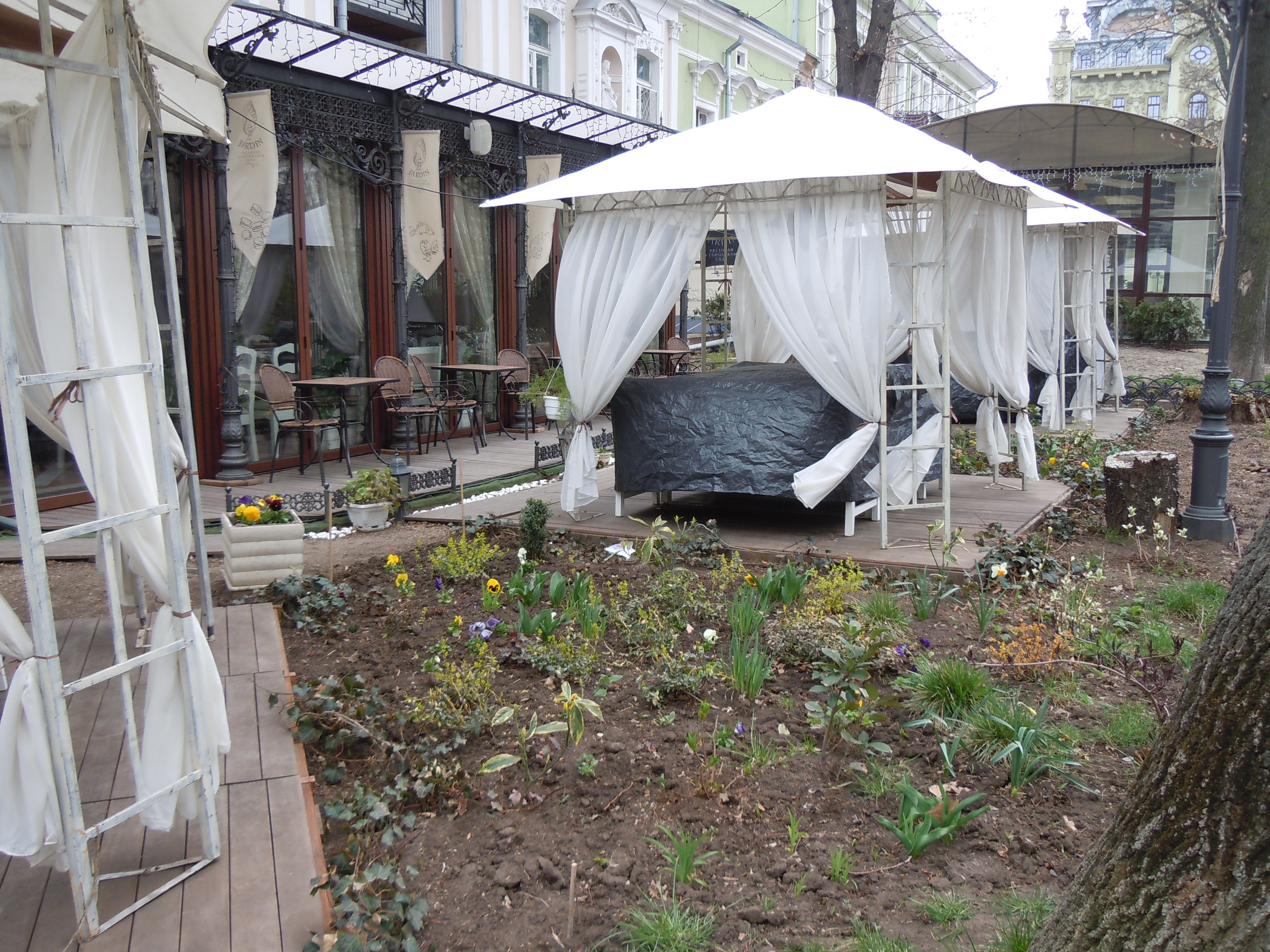
The restaurants in the garden

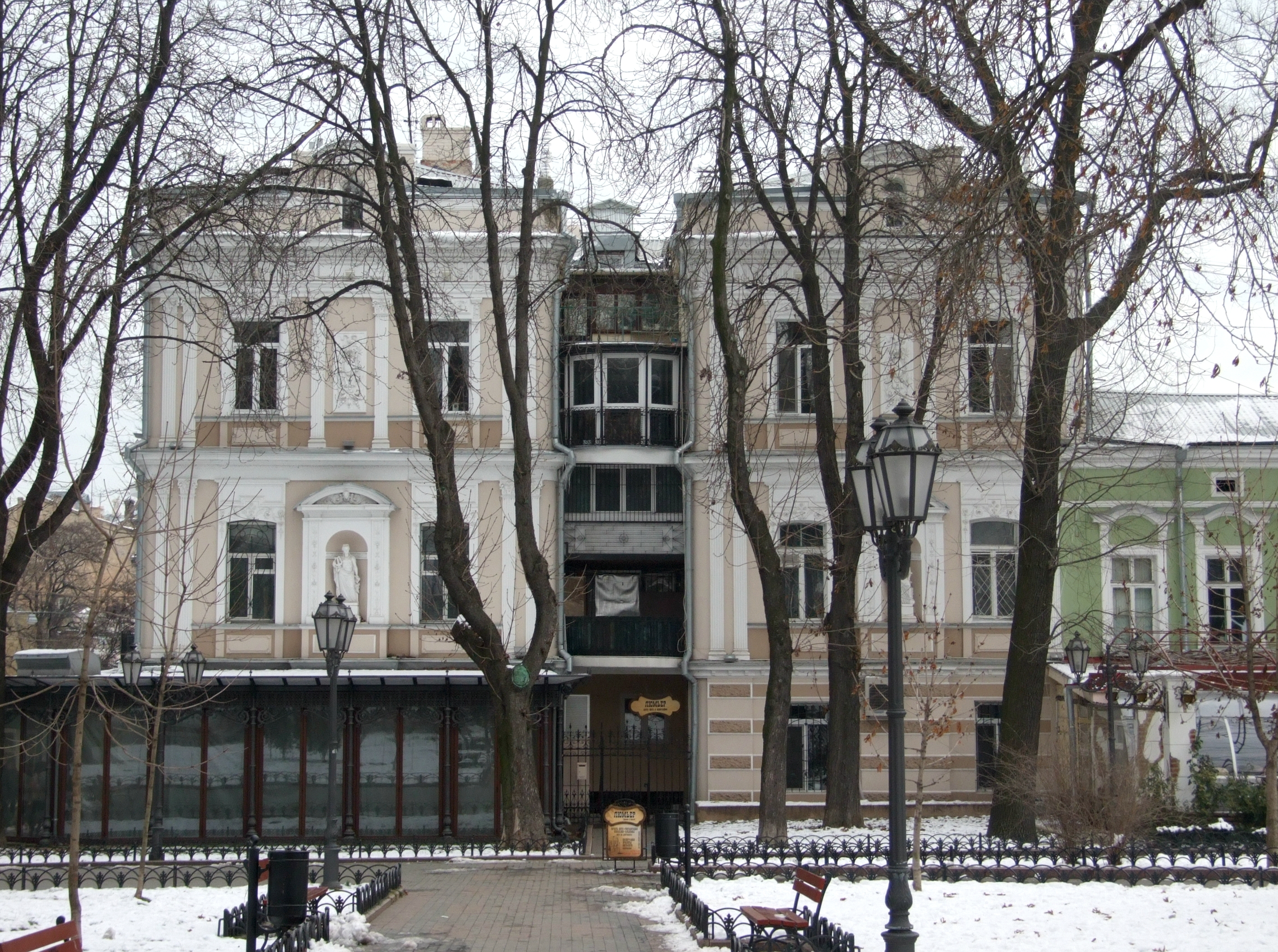
The facades of the old buildings

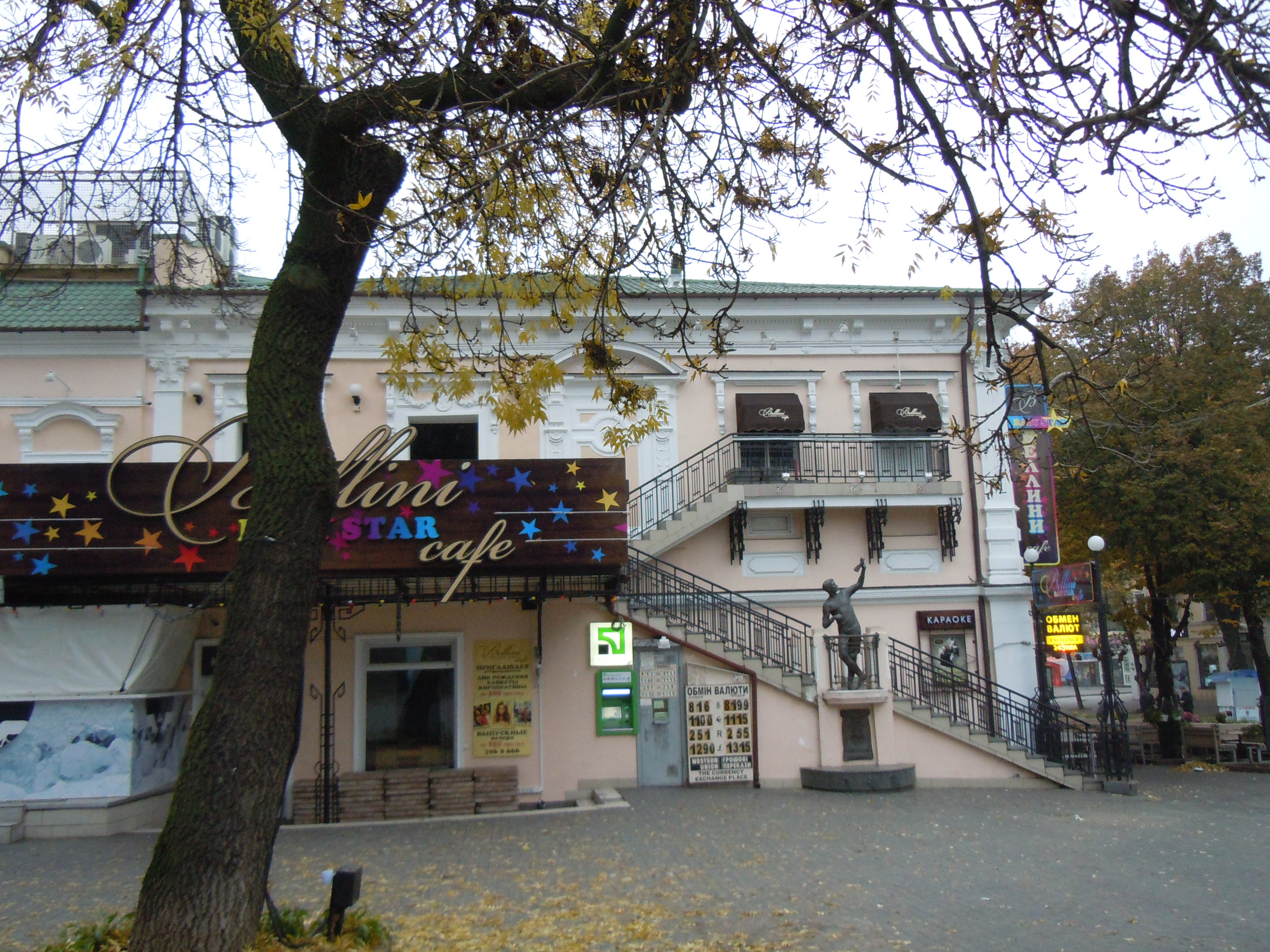
The facades of the old buildings

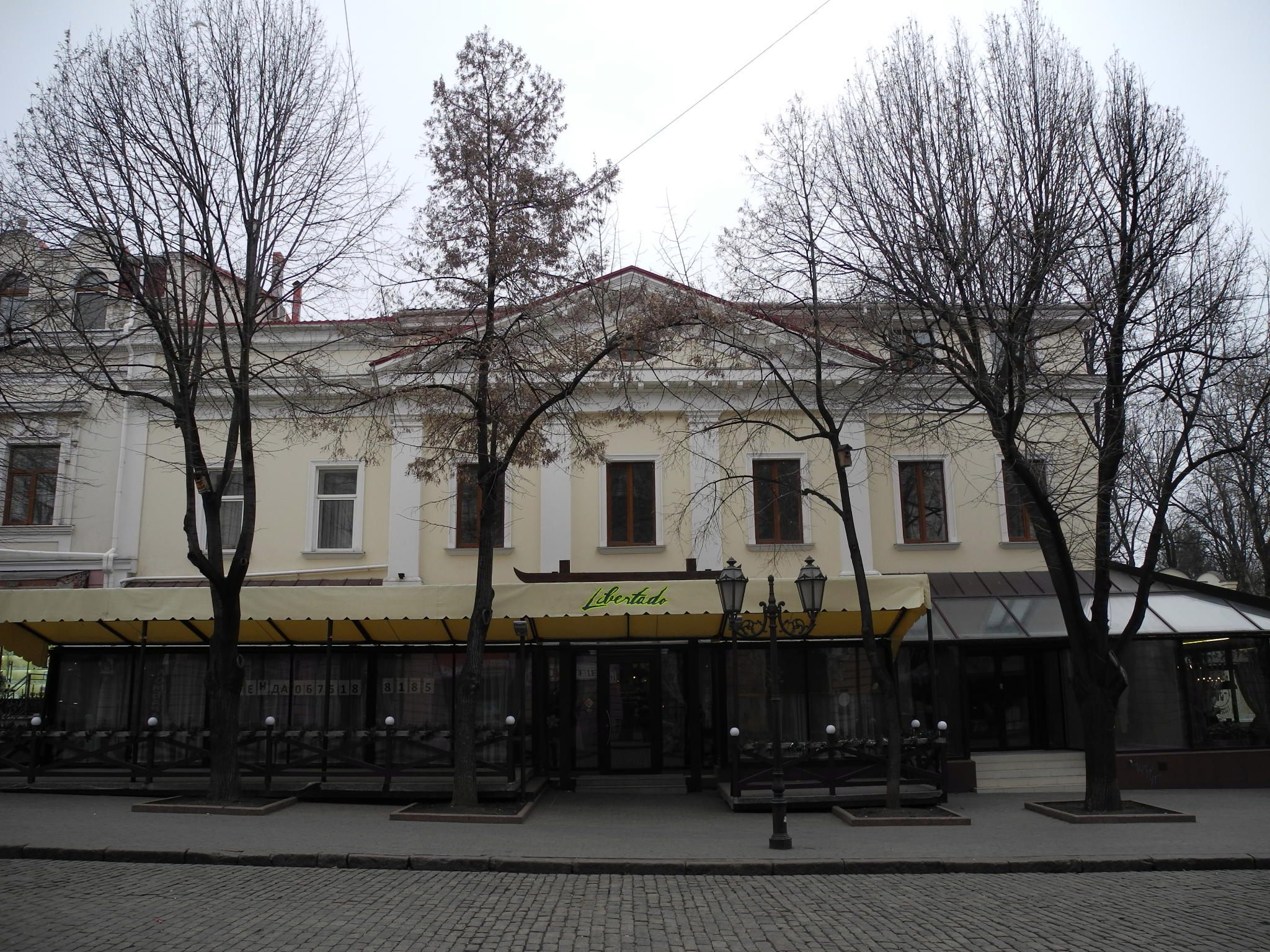
The house of Felix de Ribas (with the restaurant at the groundfloor)

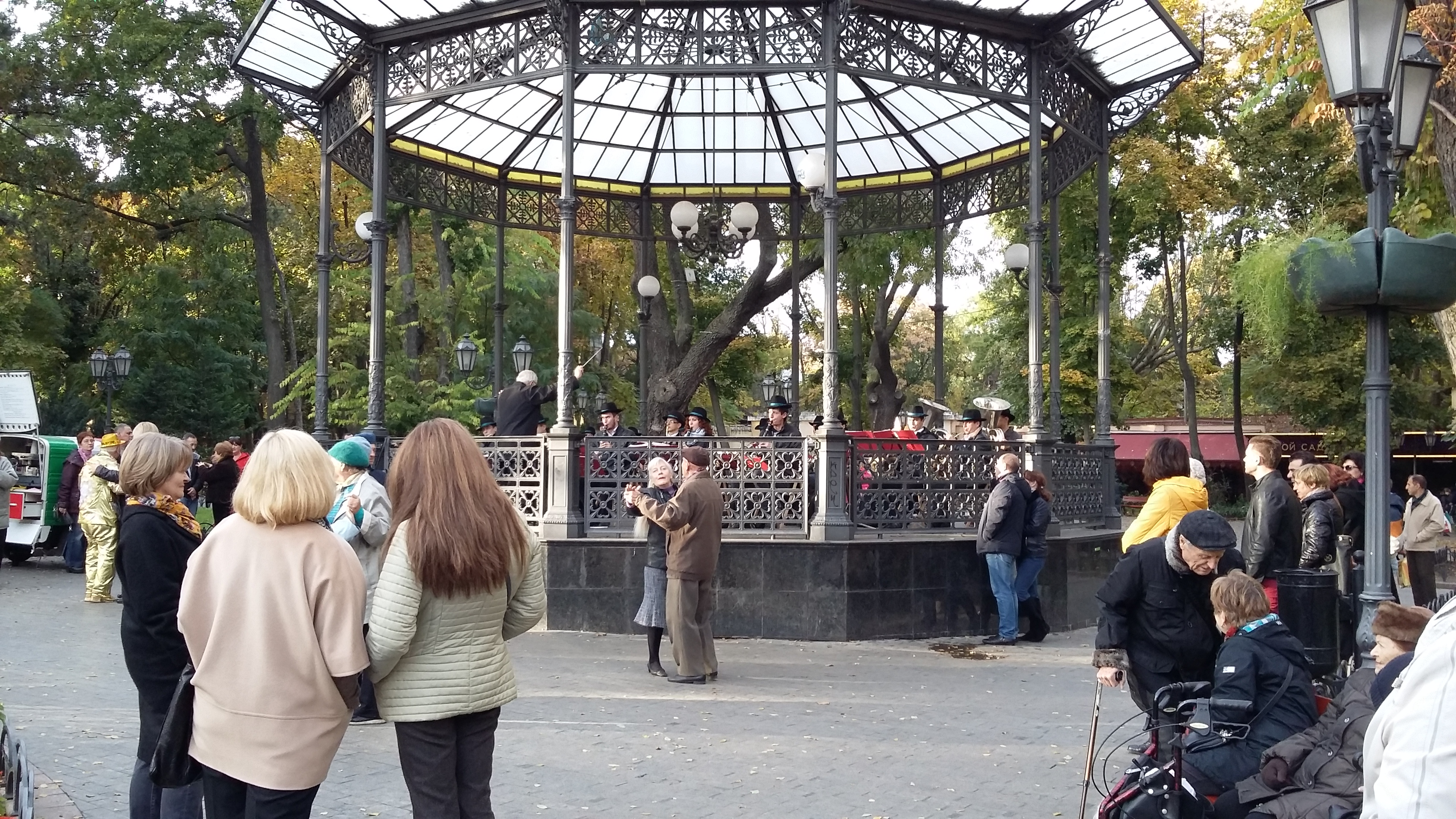
An old couple dancing & stylish band playing in City Garden, Odesa, Ukraine
