= Derybasivska Street =

Street in Odesa, Ukraine

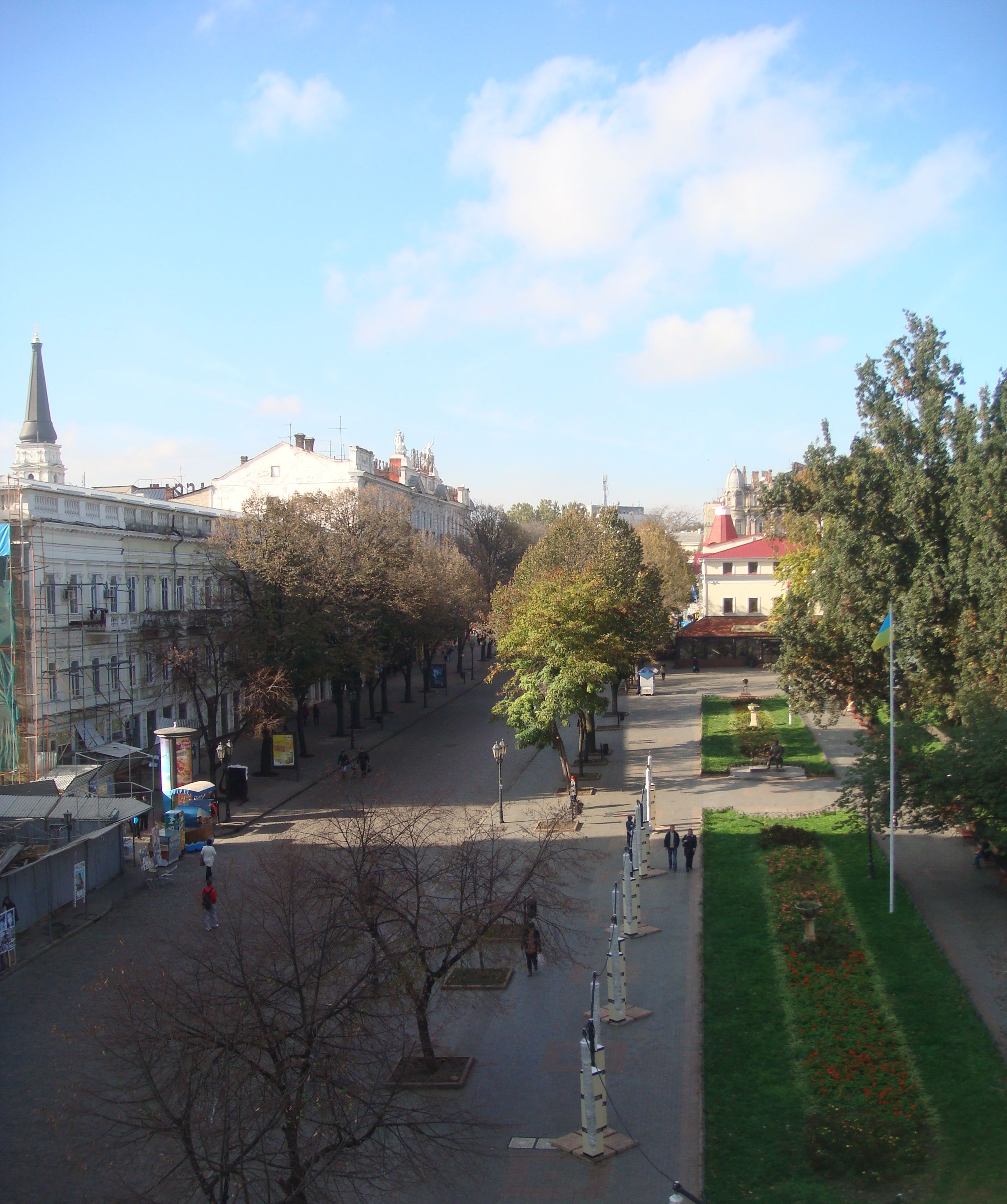
- Interactive map of Derybasivska Street
- Native name: Дерибасівська (Ukrainian)
- Namesake: Felix de Ribas
- Length: 950 m (3,120 ft)
- Postal code: 65082, 65045, 65026
- Coordinates: 46°29′04″N 30°44′04″E
- From: 46.483612°N 30.744969°E
- To: 46.484559°N 30.732785°E

Vulytsia Derybasivska (Ukrainian: Дерибасівська) or De Ribas Street is a pedestrian walkway (street) in the heart of Odesa, Ukraine. The street is named after José de Ribas, who was the builder of Odesa, the head of military and civil administration and had a house on this street.

Next to the street is Odesa's first park, which was built shortly after the foundation of the city in 1803 by the De Ribas brothers, Joseph and Felix (Josep and Fèlix). This park has a fountain, bandstand, and several monuments, including a sculpture of a lion and lioness with her cubs, a chair commemorating the famous book "The Twelve Chairs", two monuments to Leonid Utyosov (a sculpture and also a phone which plays his music), and a monument to Sergey Utochkin, a famous pilot.

== History ==
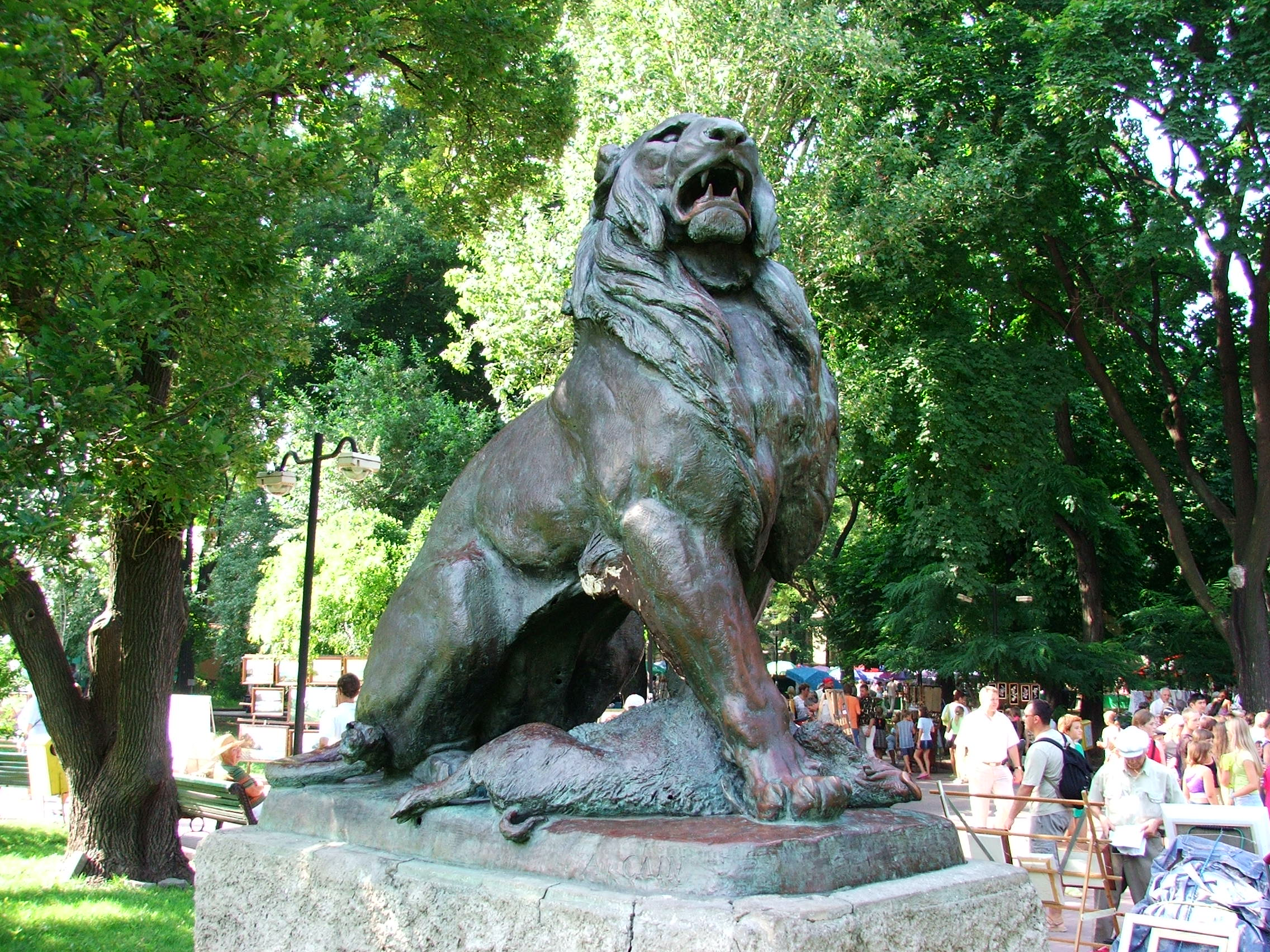
Lion in the park

Derybasivska Street was previously named Gimnazskaya (Gimnazicheskaya) Street after the Gymnasium which opened April 16, 1804. It was renamed for de Ribas on July 6, 1811, being called Deribasovskaya or de Ribasovskaya or just Ribasovskaya. During the first years of Bolshevik rule (1920–1938) it was named after the German socialist Ferdinand Lassalle. From 1938 to 1941, it was called Chkalov Street. Finally, on November 19, 1941, it was renamed Derybasivska.

Derybasivska street was closed to car traffic and turned into a pedestrian zone in the spring of 1984. Prior to that, it was used not only by cars, but also by the city trolleybuses of route 1 and 2, which were moved to the neighbouring streets after replanning. Derybasivska Street runs from near Kachynskoho Street up to the Preobrazhenska and Sadova, crossing Italiiska, Rishelievska, Yevropeiska, Havanna, and Ivana Lutsenka Lane.

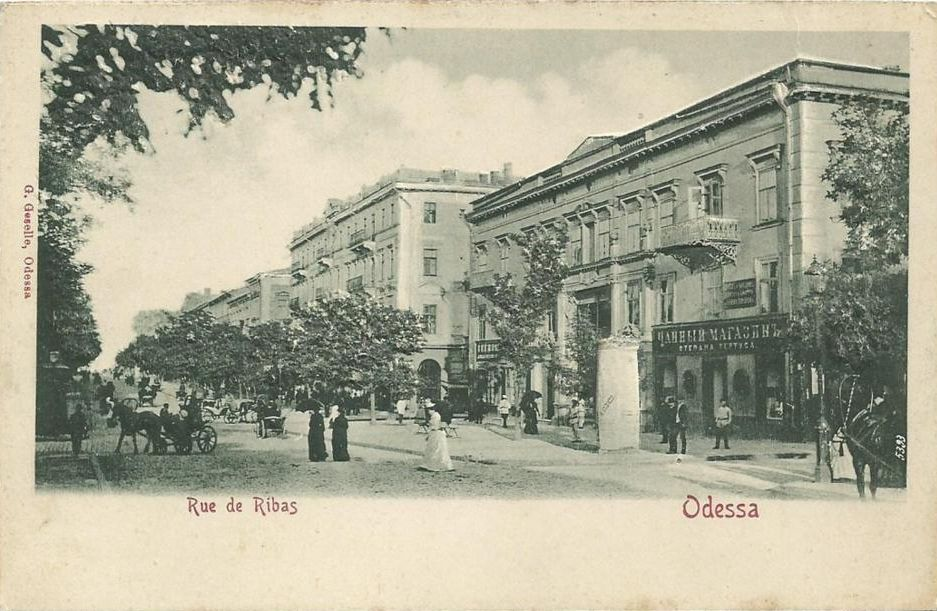
Old photo reads: "Rue de Ribas"

Every year on first of April the Humorina procession goes the whole length of Derybasivska Street, which is packed with tens of thousands of onlookers and participants dressed in funny costumes.

== See also ==
- Weather Is Good on Deribasovskaya, It Rains Again on Brighton Beach, a 1992 film
