= Yaponchik =

Yaponchik (Япончик) is a nickname widely known in the Russian-speaking criminal world. It may refer to:

- Mishka Yaponchik, Odesa robber turned Soviet military leader (1881–1919)
- Fictional character in Russian TV series The Life and Adventures of Mishka Yaponchik, only loosely based on the real-life thug
- Vyacheslav Ivankov, Russian mafia boss (1940–2009)

Literally, yaponchik means "little Japanese", though none of the two above had any Japanese ancestry.
