= Maria (play) =

1930s play by Isaac Babel

The play Maria, a portrait of the sordid underbelly of Soviet society during the Russian Civil War, was written by Isaac Babel during the mid-1930s.

== Plot ==
Maria is set in Saint Petersburg during the Russian Civil War. In the aftermath of the October Revolution, the once iron clad Russian class system has disintegrated. The plot focuses on the aristocratic Mukovnin family and their attempts to adapt to the hardships of war communism and chaos. The elderly General Mukovnin is writing books about Russia's military history, where he criticizes the harsh treatment of common soldiers under the Imperial Russian Army. He sympathizes with Lenin's Bolsheviks and regards them as "gatherers of the Russian lands" akin to Ivan Kalita. His daughter, the ditzy and superficial Ludmila, is hoping for an advantageous marriage with Isaac Dimshits, the Jewish mob boss who dominates the city's black market food supply. Her cousin, Katya Felsen, is unhappy and pessimistic about the new regime, despite having an affair with a senior Soviet Army officer. The General's eldest daughter, Maria, is an idealistic Communist and a political officer assigned to the Soviet Army. During the entire play, she is away on the front and is quoted, but never seen.

Ultimately, Dimshits makes sexual advances to Ludmila, who repels them by claiming to have toothache, to his great discontent and humiliation. Ludmila's intentions are to achieve Dimshits' respect and finally marry him. Dimshits, however, is already married, and only wants Ludmila as a mistress. According to Dimshits, "People like her are unworthy of even tying my wife's shoelaces!"

At the time of their next rendezvous, the embittered Dimshits does not show up. In the adjacent apartment, Captain Viskovsky, a White Army officer turned jewel thief who works for Dimshits and whose advances were rejected by Maria. Viskovsky is drinking together with Yasha Kravchenko, a corrupt artillery officer in the Red Army. Viskovsky invites Ludmila in, gets her drunk and then rapes her in a nearby room. Disgusted, Kravchenko reproaches him for having infected Ludmila with Gonorrhea. Viskovsky threatens to beat Kravchenko, who pulls his gun and initiates a gun battle in which each kills the other. As a result, the Soviet police, or militsiya, arrest Ludmila, the lone survivor. At the station, the interrogator assumes that she is a prostitute who smuggles thread for Dimshits' gang. While she protests her innocence and begs for a doctor, the interrogator demands to know how many times she has been arrested, and then shouts in anger that he has not slept in five days.

A crippled World War I veteran, who also works for Dimshits, arrives at the Mukovnins' apartment with the news. The General, fearful that she may have been arrested by the CHEKA, first intends to demand her release, then realizes that that is impossible and instead wants to take advice with Maria. Therefore, he checks to make sure that his other daughter, Maria, has received his earlier telegram, in which he urged her to return from the front to visit him. He learns that the telegram has been delivered and convinces himself that Maria will be coming very soon. He even declares that he is not worried about Ludmila and that this will be a valuable lesson for her, but then has a massive heart attack seconds later. His condition is critical, but it proves impossible to fetch a doctor at night to help him.

Soon afterwards, a soldier from Maria's division arrives. He announces that Maria has been unable to come because of the continuing military operations. The General enters the room, expecting to see Maria, but is shocked to see only a soldier he does not know and possibly assumes that Maria has been killed. He instantly dies of a massive stroke.

Later, two workers prepare the Mukovnins' former apartment for its new tenants. They are "bossed around" by their forewoman, the local street-sweeper, who is in charge of apartments. Katya arrives with Sushkin, a person who describes himself as a "lover of antiquities". She announces that she is selling the Mukovnins' antique furniture on Maria's orders. The forewoman of the workers refuses to allow this, saying that the new tenants were promised a fully furnished apartment. An enraged Sushkin threatens her, hinting that he can bring "people" (presumably militsiya men or CHEKA agents) to arrest her. However, she refuses to yield unless he can show her a warrant. After Sushkin leaves in a huff, the two workers comment on the forewoman's conduct and observe that she wasn't so daring during the old general's time. Yet, they recall the general as a nice person, loved by the common people. Meanwhile, the new tenants, a worker and his pregnant wife, settle into their new home.

== Reception ==
Maria is rooted in Babel's work as an investigative reporter for Maxim Gorky's Menshevik newspaper, Novaya zhizn (Новая жизнь). Babel published there between March and July 1918, when Vladimir Lenin ordered the closing of all newspapers not controlled by the CPSU.

Babel later recalled, however,

"My journalistic work gave me a lot, especially in the sense of material. I managed to amass an incredible number of facts, which proved to be an invaluable creative tool. I struck up friendships with morgue attendants, criminal investigators, and government clerks. Later, when I began writing fiction, I found myself always returning to these 'subjects', which were so close to me, in order to put character types, situations, and everyday life into perspective. Journalistic work is full of adventure."

After the completion of Maria in the mid-1930s, Babel allowed the unpublished manuscript to be examined by Gorky, who remained his friend and mentor. Noting the play's implicit rejection of socialist realism, Gorky accused Babel of having a "Baudelairian predilection for rotting meat." Gorky further warned his friend that "political inferences" would be made "that will be personally harmful to you."

According to Babel's common law wife, Antonina Pirozhkova,

"Once Babel went to the Moscow Art Theater when his play Mariya was being given its first reading, and when he returned home he told me that all the actresses had been impatient to find out what the leading female role was like and who would be cast in it. It turned out that there was no leading female character present on the stage in this play. Babel thought that the play had not come off well, but he was always critical of his own work."

Although intended to be performed by Moscow's Vakhtangov Theatre in 1935, the premiere of Maria was cancelled by the NKVD during rehearsals. Four years later, Isaac Babel was arrested, tortured, and shot as part of Joseph Stalin's Great Purge. His surviving manuscripts were confiscated by the NKVD and destroyed. As a result, Maria was never performed in Russia until after the dissolution of the Soviet Union.

== Structure ==
The storyline of Maria is structured in an unconventional, nonlinear fashion. According to a cast member from the American premiere,

"The play runs like a film — there are so many different locations and characters that you have to be very attentive. They even had to build a revolving stage in order to accommodate all of the changing locations in the story.... The play flows in a very subtle manner."

== Legacy ==
Although it was very popular at Western European colleges during the 1960s, it was not performed in Babel's homeland until 1994. An English translation by Harold Shukman and Michael Glenny was published by Penguin in 1966; a further translation by Peter Constantine appeared in 2002 and was edited by Nathalie Babel Brown. Maria's American premiere, directed by Carl Weber, took place at Stanford University two years later.

According to Weber,

"The play is very controversial. [It] shows the stories of both sides clashing with each other during the Russian Civil War — the Bolsheviks and the old society members — without making a judgment one way or another. Babel’s opinion on either side is very ambiguous, but he does make the statement that what happened after the Bolshevik Revolution may not have been the best thing for Russia."

== Resources ==
- "The Complete Works of Isaac Babel," Edited by Nathalie Babel Brown, 2002.
