= Culture of Odesa =

Culture of citizens of Odesa

The culture of Odesa is a blend of Russian, Yiddish, and Ukrainian cultures, and Odesa itself has played a notable role in Russian and Yiddish folklore.

== Dialects ==
The Russian language as spoken in Odesa is influenced by Yiddish and Ukrainian in grammar, vocabulary, and phraseology. As a result, many phrases sound inherently and uniquely humorous to Russian speakers and constitute a staple of Odesa humour. Also, the Odesa dialect of Yiddish has plenty of Russianisms.

== Cultural image of Odesa ==
To a significant extent the image of Odesa in Russophone culture is influenced by The Odessa Tales of Isaac Babel. Odesa is often referred to by the collocation "Odesa Mama" (Mom Odesa), a term that originated in Russian criminal (blatnoy) subculture. The reputation of the city as a criminal center originated in Imperial Russian times and the early Soviet era, and is similar to the reputation of Al Capone era Chicago.

== Odesa humor ==
Odesa humor is a notable part of both Jewish humor and Russian humor.

Since 1972 Odesa has been hosting the annual festival of humor, Humorina. For this and other reasons Odesa was known as the "capital of humor" in the Soviet Union.

== Memorable places ==
Many places in Odesa are memorable not only for their intrinsic cultural value, but also for their place in Odesa folklore.

- Duc de Richelieu monument
- Derybasivska Street
- Moldavanka
- Odesa catacombs
- Potemkin Stairs
- Prymorskyi Boulevard
- Pryvoz Market
