= Benya Krik =

Fictional character

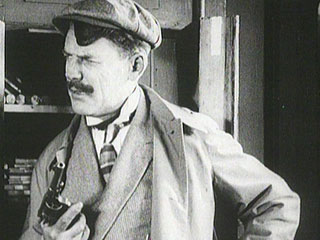
Yuri Shumsky as Benya Krik

Benya Krik (Russian: Беня Крик) is a fictional character from The Odessa Tales, a collection of short stories by Isaac Babel, the derived works and "fan fiction".

These stories primarily deal with the Jewish underworld of Moldavanka, a ghetto of Odessa, and the mob leader, Benya Krik, known as the King, a romanticized "gallant thug". His character was loosely based on the real gangster, Mishka Yaponchik.

These stories were the base of the 1927 silent film Benya Krik. The screenplay was published in 1926 in a book form titled Беня Крик (кино-повесть) ("Benya Krik (Cinema-Novel)").

In 1926–1928 Babel wrote a play Sunset loosely based on the story with the same name from The Odessa Tales. In 1990 a film Sunset was shot based on the same story. The focus of the three works is not Benya himself, but his family.

A film The Art of Living in Odessa was released in 1989, directed by Georgi Yungvald-Khilkevich and based on The Odessa Tales.

A musical film titled The Drayman and the King was directed by Vladimir Alenikov, based on The Odessa Tales and the play Sunset. It was shot in 1989 and premiered in 1990. ('Drayman' refers to Mendel Krik, the father of Benya Krik).

== See also ==
- Culture of Odessa
