= The Life and Adventures of Mishka Yaponchik =

- Genre: biographical drama
- Created by: Vitaly Bordachyov; Vlad Ryashin; Yelizaveta Troitskaya
- Directed by: Sergey Ginzburg
- Starring: Evgeniy Tkachuk; Elena Shamova; Alexey Filimonov; Artyom Tkachenko; Igor Savochkin
- Composer: Vladimir Davydenko
- Countries of origin: Russia; Ukraine
- Original language: Russian
- No. of seasons: 1
- No. of episodes: 12

Production
- Producer: Vlad Ryashin
- Camera setup: Eduard Moshkovich
- Running time: 50 minutes
- Production company: Star Media (Ukraine)

Original release
- Network: Channel One Russia; Inter (Ukraine)
- Release: December 5, 2011

The Life and Adventures of Mishka Yaponchik (Russian: Жизнь и приключения Мишки Япончика, romanized: Zhizn i priklyucheniya Mishki Yaponchika) is a crime television series, based on real events. Directed by Sergey Ginzburg.

Internationally language title is a Once Upon a Time in Odessa.

== Plot ==
The film tells the story of the legendary Odessa's Robin Hood, Mikhail (Moshe-Yaakov) Vinnitsky known as Mishka Yaponchik. He came out of prison, returned to Odessa and cobbled together his own band. Mishka Yaponchik becomes king of thieves. His raids become more wittier. The storyline of the series love story woven thief to a local rich man's daughter. The film is based on real events.

The authors of the series did not pursue the goal to create a thoroughly historically tied now, their goal, a love story based on the works of Isaac Babel.

== Cast ==
- Evgeniy Tkachuk as Mishka Yaponchik
- Elena Shamova as Tsilya Averman, Mishka Yaponchik's wife
- Alexey Filimonov as Izya Mayorchik
- Artyom Tkachenko as Rzhevskij-Rajewski
- Igor Savochkin as Shark, a bandit
- Anatoly Kot as Stotsky
- Oleg Shkolnik as Meer Vinnitsky
- Andrey Urgant as Hepner Yoval Lazarevich
- Pavel Priluchny as Leonid Utesov
- Kirill Polukhin as Grigory Kotovsky
- Valentin Gaft as Mendel Hersh
- Rimma Markova as Pani Basia
- Sergei Ginzburg as Deyev, regiment commander

== Soundtrack ==
- Radda Erdenko — Spinning, Spinning the Blue Bow
- Karina Gabrielyan — Tumbalalaika
- Radda Erdenko, Karina Gabrielyan — Chiribim-chirib (The Magic Song of the eternal Purim)
- Karina Gabrielyan — Bublički
- Radda Erdenko — Joh-choh-choh
- Karina Gabrielyan — Yes, My Dove
- Radda Erdenko — Аy Аy Нora
- Karina Gabrielyan — Abi Gezunt
- Vladimir Dolinsky — Lemonchik
- The Barry Sisters — Bei Mir Bistu Shein
- Alik Farber — Rachel, To You Are Dead, You To Me Like!
