= Pirozhkov =

Pirozhkov (Russian: Пирожков, from пирожок meaning pirozhok, a small pie) is a Russian masculine surname, its feminine counterpart is Pirozhkova. It may refer to

- Antonina Pirozhkova (1909–2010), Russian civil engineer and writer
- Elena Pirozhkova (born 1986), Russian-American wrestler
