= Red Cavalry =

Soviet novel-in-stories

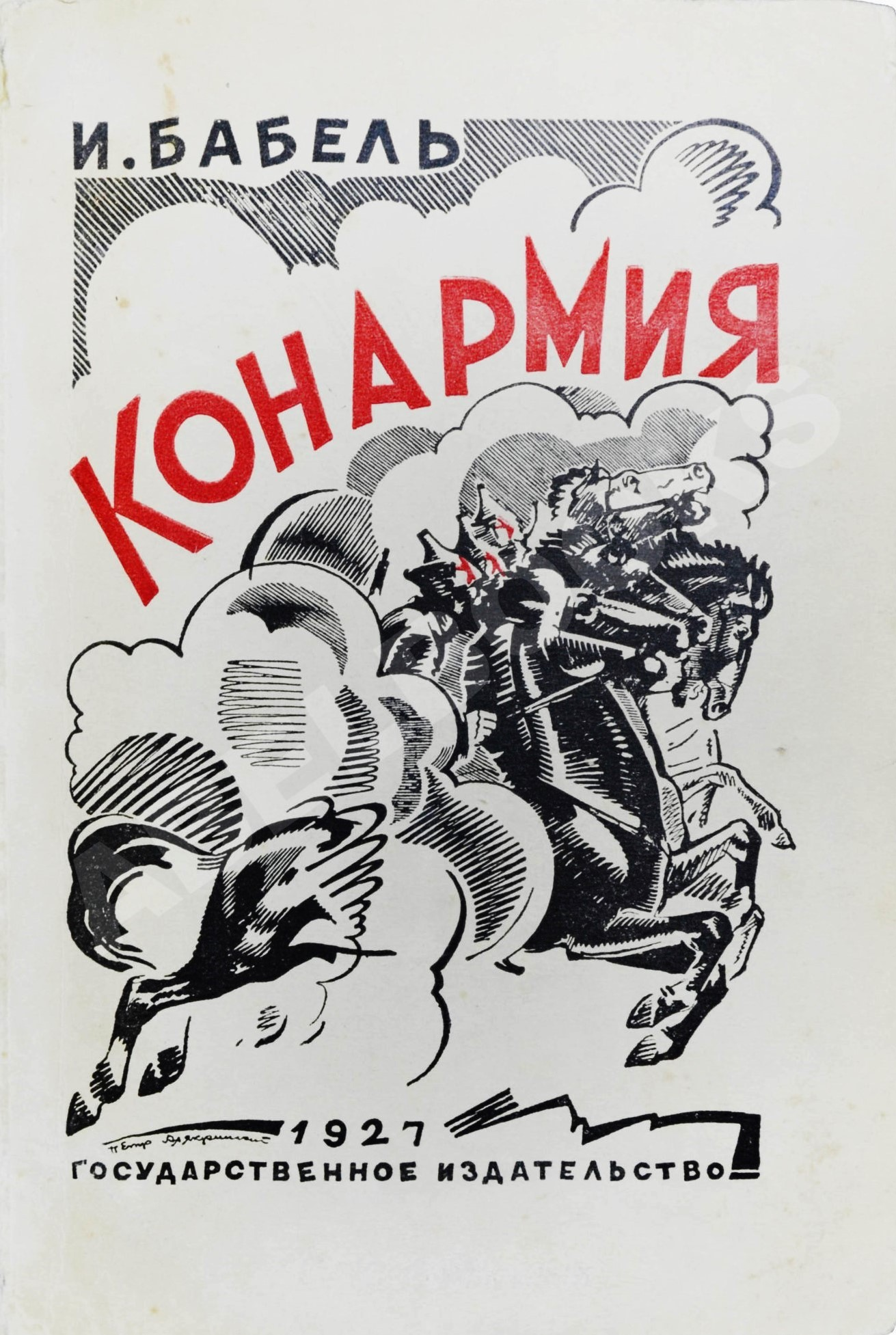
First edition

Red Cavalry or Konarmiya (Note: "Konarmiya" is an acronym for "konnaya armiya", i.e., "cavalry army".) (Russian: Конармия) is a collection of short stories by Russian author Isaac Babel about the 1st Cavalry Army. The stories take place during the Polish–Soviet War and are based on Babel's diary, which he maintained when he was a journalist assigned to the Semyon Budyonny's First Cavalry Army. First published in the 1920s, the book was one of the Russian people's first literary exposures to the dark, bitter reality of the war. During the 1920s, writers of fiction (like Babel) were given a relatively good degree of freedom compared to the mass censorship and totalitarianism that would follow Joseph Stalin's ascent to power, and certain levels of criticism could even be published. But his works would be withdrawn from sale after 1933 and would not return to bookshelves until after Stalin's death twenty years later.

The book was also registered on Nazi Germany's so-called "combustion lists" to be withdrawn from public and school libraries during the Nazi book burnings in 1933.

On the advice of Maxim Gorky, the young Babel, his literary career only beginning, set off to join the Soviet Red Cavalry as a war correspondent and propagandist. The violence of Red Cavalry seemed to harshly contrast the gentle nature of the young writer from Odessa. This contrast is also apparent in stories like "My First Goose", where the narrator, on account of his glasses, must prove himself worthy of his fellow soldiers' camaraderie (and deny his "intellectuality") by brutally killing a goose and ordering a woman to cook it.

Antisemitism is another major theme dealt with in the book. Babel chronicles how both the Red and White Armies, while fighting each other, would also both commit horrible atrocities against the Jews in the old Jewish Pale, leading Gedali, a Jewish shopkeeper, to famously ask, "Which is the Revolution and which the counterrevolution?" In stories like "Gedali", the narrator is forced to confront his dual, seemingly contradictory nature as both a Jew and a fighter for the Revolution.

Contemporary American writer Denis Johnson cites the book as an important influence for his collection of short stories Jesus' Son, saying dismissively that the collection was "a rip-off of Isaac Babel’s Red Cavalry" in an interview with New Yorker Fiction Editor Deborah Treisman. Another writer who found inspiration in this work was Frank O'Connor especially in his short story Guests of the Nation.

== Translations ==
- Nadia Helstein: Red Cavalry (Knopf, 1929)
- Walter Morison, in The Collected Stories (1955). Revised versions of Helstein's translations, except "Argamak".
- David McDuff, in Collected Stories (1994, Penguin)
- Peter Constantine, in The Complete Works of Isaac Babel (Norton, 2002)
- Boris Dralyuk: Red Cavalry (Pushkin Press, 2015)
- Val Vinokur, in The Essential Fictions (Northwestern University Press, 2017)

== Bibliographic information ==
- Конармия
- Isaac Babel, Red Cavalry , W. W. Norton & Company, 2003, ISBN 0-393-32423-0. (Google Books link)
