= Sunset (play) =

1926 play by Isaac Babel

The play Sunset was written by Isaac Babel in 1926, based on his short story collection The Odessa Tales.

== Plot ==
The play is set in Moldavanka, Odessa's Jewish Quarter in 1913. The plot revolves around the volatile relationship between neighborhood mob boss Benya Krik and his philandering, alcoholic father Mendel Krik.

As the curtain rises, the Krik family awaits the arrival of Bobrinets, a wealthy suitor who wishes to marry Dvoira Krik. Although his daughter is already considered an old maid, Mendel Krik refuses to give her a dowry and insults Bobrinets, who leaves in a huff. Later, a weeping Nekhama Krik reminds her husband that the Jewish elders are about to bar him from the synagogue. However, Mendel mocks her as she laments having no grandchildren.

Later, Mendel drinks up his family's money at the local saloon and begins an extramarital affair with Marusia Kholodenko, a 20-year-old Gentile. Despite their Russian Orthodox faith, the Kholodenko family is ecstatic to have a new source of money.

Enraged by rumors that their father is about to disinherit them and elope to Bessarabia with Marusia, Benya and Lvovka Krik attack their father. Although Lvovka is severely beaten, Benya batters his father to a pulp and forbids him from leaving the house or Nekhama.

In the aftermath, Benya and Lvovka arrange to Dvoira to receive a dowry to marry Bobrinets. They also pay for an abortion for the pregnant Marusia. At a party to celebrate Dvoira's engagement, Rabbi Ben Zkharia declares that "everything is as it should be" and proposes a toast to the sons of Mendel Krik.

== Reception ==
According to Nathalie Babel Brown,

"Sunset premiered at the Baku Worker's Theatre on October 23, 1927 and played in Odessa, Kiev, and the Moscow Art Theatre. The reviews, however, were mixed. Some critics praised the play's 'powerful anti-bourgeois stance and its interesting 'fathers and sons' theme. But in Moscow, particularly, critics felt that the play's attitude toward the bourgeoisie was contradictory and weak. Sunset closed, and was dropped from the repertoire of the Moscow Art Theatre.

However, Sunset continued to have many admirers. In a 1928 letter to his White emigre father, Boris Pasternak wrote, "Yesterday, I read Sunset, a play by Babel, and almost for the first time in my life I found that Jewry, as an ethnic fact, was a phenomenon of positive, unproblematic importance and power... I should like you to read this remarkable play..."

According to Babel's common law wife Antonina Pirozhkova, filmmaker Sergei Eisenstein was also an admirer of Sunset and often compared it to the writings of Émile Zola for, "illuminating capitalist relationships through the experience of a single family." Eisenstein was also quite critical of the Moscow Art Theatre, "for its weak staging of the play, particularly for failing to convey to the audience every single word of its unusually terse text."

== Resources ==
- The Complete Works of Isaac Babel, edited by Nathalie Babel Brown, 2002.
