= Meyer Zayder =

Russian assassin of Grigory Kotovsky (d. 1930)

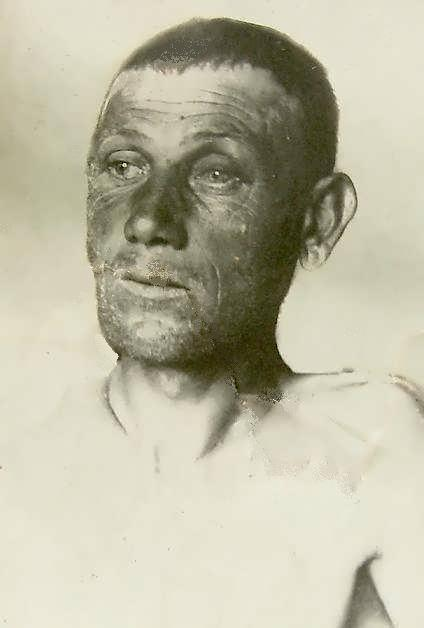
- Meyer Zayder
- Born: Presumably the 1880s Unknown
- Died: 1930; Kharkiv, Ukrainian SSR, Soviet Union

Meyer Zayder (Russian: Мейер Зайдер; died 1930; also written Meyer Seider) was a criminal from Odessa, Russian Empire (now Ukraine), known for fatally shooting Soviet general Grigory Kotovsky on 6 August 1925.

== Biography ==
Before the October Revolution Zayder was reputed as the owner of one of the biggest brothels in Odessa. Zayder was a very wealthy man and was even going to buy a mansion overlooking the Black Sea.

At the same time, the Bolshevik underground, headed by Grigory Kotovsky, operated in Odessa. It took part in the raids on prisons and counterintelligence of General Denikin, seized weapons and transported them to the Transnistrian partisans, and organized sabotage of the railways.

== Acquaintance with Kotovsky ==
Zayder and Kotovsky met in the following circumstances. One day, fleeing persecution, the latter in the uniform of the captain of artillery came to him, turning directly from the threshold:

I'm Kotovsky. I need a key from your attic ... (after getting the key) you did not see any captain today. Did you?

Zayder hid Kotovsky in his attic. At night, having disguised himself in civilian clothes and wearing a wig, went down and left his apartment, saying that he was now his debtor.

In 1919, Zayder was adjutant to the gangster and socialist Mishka Yaponchik, and was known by the nickname "Majorchik." In 1920, Zayder became unemployed, since the Soviet government, which was finally established in Odesa, closed the brothel owned by him. For two years he was interrupted by casual earnings. In 1922, Zayder learned that a cavalry corps was stationed in Uman, commanded by his debtor Kotovsky, and went to him with a request for help. Kotovsky helped Zayder, arranging that the head of the guard Peregonovsky sugar factory, located near Uman. Zayder, in turn, helped Kotovsky in settling the life of his corps. So, his idea was to prepare skins for cats and exchange them in Ivanovo for fabrics that went to uniforms. Zayder, according to eyewitnesses, was very grateful to Kotovsky for the help, since finding work in the early 1920s was very difficult and there were about 1.5 million people on labor exchanges (as of 1925).

== Assassination of Kotovsky ==
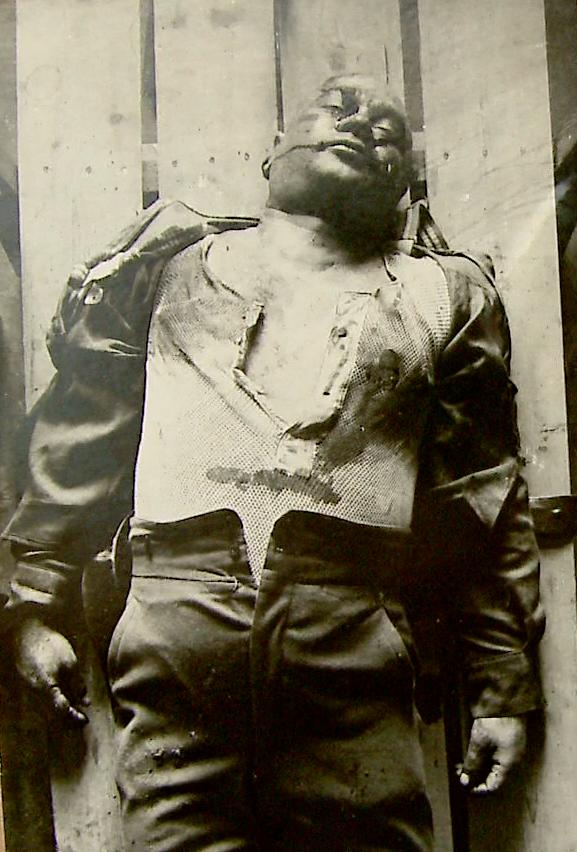
Kotovsky's body after the murder

In early August 1925, Zayder came to the Chebank farm, where Kotovsky lived temporarily. His motivation was that he wanted to help his family get together on the way back. It is possible that Kotovsky knew in advance about Zayder's arrival, but did not interfere with this, completely trusting him.

On the evening of 5 August 1925, Kotovsky was invited to a "bonfire" at a pioneer camp near Chebanki Luzanovsky, after which he returned home. Approximately at 23:00 on the occasion of Kotovsky's departure, the red commanders who lived in the neighbourhood decided to give him a solemn farewell. Kotovsky's wife recalled the moment of the murder:

... Kotovsky reluctantly went, because he did not like such evenings and was tired: he told the pioneers about the liquidation of Antonov's gang, which for him always meant to relive a great nervous tension. The evening, as they say, was not glued. There were loud speeches and toasts, but Kotovsky was indifferent and extraordinarily boring. After about three hours, they began to disperse. Kotovsky was detained by the senior accountant of the Central Administration of Military-Industrial Economy who had just arrived to him. I went home alone and made my bed. Suddenly I hear short revolver shots – one, the second, and then – dead silence ... I ran to the shots ... At the corner of the main building of holidaymakers I see Kotovsky's flattened body facing down. I rush to the pulse – no pulse

A bullet shot by a murderer from a revolver hit Kotovsky in the aorta. Death came instantly. Neighbours came running at the shots. The murderer soon appeared himself. Kotovsky's son recalled:

... Soon after my father was brought to the veranda, and my mother was left alone by the body, Zayder ran in and fell to her knees before her, began to beat in hysterics: "I killed the commander!" It seemed to Mama that he was going to enter the room where I slept, and she shouted: "There, you scoundrel!", blocking Zayder's way. Zayder quickly disappeared

At dawn of the same day, Zayder was arrested. During the investigation and at the trial he fully admitted his guilt, however, he often changed his testimony. So, during the investigation, he claimed that he had shot Kotovsky out of jealousy, and at court stated that he had killed him because he had not raised him up the ranks. The trial took place in August 1926. Zayder was sentenced to ten years in prison. From the verdict, the charges were excluded in cooperation with the Romanian special services.

The punishment of Meyer Zayder was serving in the Kharkiv pre-trial detention centre. He soon became the head of the prison club and was transferred to an unconditional system of detention and was given the right to freely exit from prison to the city. In 1928, having been imprisoned for less than three years, Zayder was released on parole for exemplary behaviour. After his release, he got a job as a railway wagon co-driver.

In the fall of 1930, the 3rd Bessarabian Cavalry Division, stationed in Berdychiv, celebrated the tenth anniversary of its military path. On the occasion of the jubilee, a holiday and manoeuvres were to be held, and veterans of the division were invited, including the widow of Grigory Kotovsky, Olga Petrovna, who had once served as a doctor in his brigade. One evening three of her former colleagues came to her and said that Meyer Zayder had sentenced them to death. Kotovskaya tried to object to them, saying that Zayder was the only witness to the murder of her husband, and in no case could he kill him, but her arguments did not convince those who prepared the murder. Intending to prevent them, Kotovskaya turned to the division commander Mishuk and the Political Department of the division.

Soon it became known that Meyer Zayder lost his life in Kharkiv, not far from the local railway station. His lifeless body was found on the canvas of the railway. It is likely that, after strangling him, the murderers threw Zayder on the rails in the hope of imitating the accident, but the train was late, and their plan failed. As it was later possible to establish, the killing was carried out by three cavalrymen who served together with Kotovsky – Strigunov, Valdman and the third, whose name is still unknown. The people who took Zayder's life were not convicted. According to the memoirs of Grigory Grigoryevich Kotovsky's son, the chief organizer of the murder of Zayder was Odessit Valdman. In 1939, he was shot over a different matter.

Many researchers of Kotovsky's murder are convinced that Zayder was not the only and not the most important criminal, but acted under someone else's leadership. The materials about the murder of Kotovsky were classified.

Zayder's friendship with Mishka Yaponchik and Kotovsky's murder, as an act of revenge, became one of the plot lines of the series "The Life and Adventures of Mishka Yaponchik". The role of Meyer Zayder (in the series he appears under the name Izya Majorchik) was performed by Alexey Filimonov.

== See also ==
- List of unsolved murders (1900–1979)
