= Benya Krik (film) =

1926 Soviet film

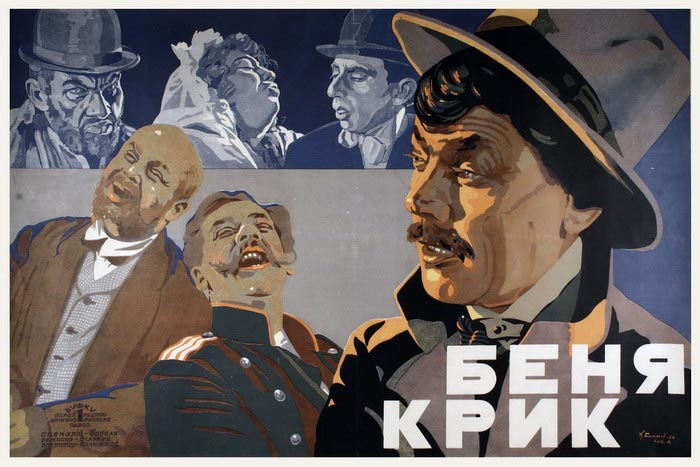
- Directed by: Vladimir Vilner
- Screenplay by: Isaak Babel
- Based on: Odessa Stories
- Release date: 1927
- Running time: 81 minutes
- Country: Soviet Union
- Language: Russian

Benya Krik (Russian: Беня Крик, romanized: Benya Krik) is a 1927 Soviet black comedy silent film, directed by Vladimir Vilner and starring Yuri Shumsky as Benya Krik.

The film depicts the career of a Jewish Russian gangster, and was based on the Odessa Stories of Isaak Babel. The main setting is the city of Odessa.

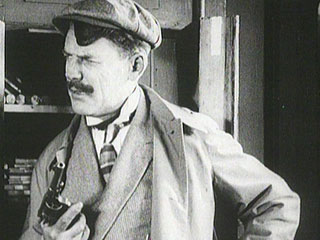
Benya Krik as portrayed by Yuri Shumsky

== Plot ==
The main character is the legendary Odessa bandit, robber, and adventurer Benya Krik, who, along with his gang of marauders, leads a wild and carefree life. In his gang, betrayal means death, and through fear and respect, Benya's gang grows to impressive proportions.

With the arrival of the October Revolution, Benya switches allegiance to the Bolsheviks, presenting his criminal gang as a division of the Workers' and Peasants' Red Army.

== Cast ==
- Matvey Lyarov as Mendel Krik
- Yuri Shumsky as Benya Krik - Mendel's son
- Nikolai Nademsky as Kolka Pakovski
- Ivan Zamychkovsky as Gleczik - the policeman
- Sergei Minin as Sobkov - the commissar
- A. Goricheva
- A. Vabnik
- Teodor Brainin
- Georgi Astafyev
- A. Sashin as Savka

== Source material ==
Benya Krik is a fictional character in Isaac Babel's cycle of short stories, Odessa Stories. He is a Jewish Russian gangster, and he and his gang of thugs are the main focus of the stories.

== Production ==
The film was based on a screenplay written by Babel in 1926, in which he adapted parts of his short stories "The King" and "How It Was Done in Odessa", in addition to creating new content.

== Restoration ==
The film was restored and supplied with English subtitles by the National Center for Jewish Film.
