= Elegy for Kosovo =

Book by Ismail Kadare

- First edition
- Author: Ismail Kadare
- Original title: Tri këngë zie për Kosovën
- Translator: Peter Constantine
- Publisher: Onufri
- English publication date: 1998
- Pages: 121 pages
- ISBN: 1559705280
- OCLC: 925184181

Elegy for Kosovo (Albanian: Tri këngë zie për Kosovën, lit. 'Three Elegies for Kosovo') is an Albanian novel written by Ismail Kadare.

== Historical background ==
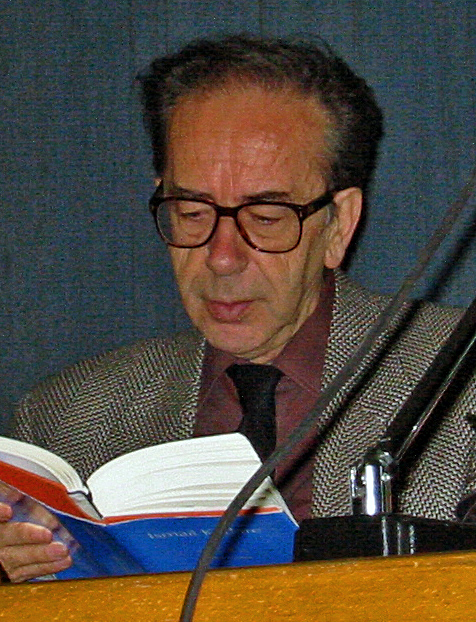
Ismail Kadare

In 1389, the Ottoman army invaded Kosovo, in the Battle of Kosovo. The battle pitted the Ottoman army, under the leadership of Sultan Murad I, against an assortment of Serbian soldiers, led by the Serbian Prince Lazar. Within two days, the Ottomans had defeated the Balkans and taken Kosovo. The battle has often been used to promote Serbian and Albanian nationalism, most famously by Slobodan Milošević and Ramush Haradinaj.

Kadare's novel is a nationalistic literary re-imagining of this battle. Although based on historical facts the novel is historical fiction.

== Characters ==
- Sultan Murad I: Leader of the Ottoman army during the Battle of Kosovo, where he dies. His body is left buried in Kosovo.
- Prince Lazar: Leader of the Balkan army during the Battle of Kosovo and prince of Serbia. He is captured during the battle, a fact that despairs the Serbian minstrel, Vladan.
- Gjorg Shrkreli: The Albanian minstrel brought to the Battle to sing Albanian epics. After the battle, he flees Kosovo with Vladan, Manolo, and a group of minstrels and fugitives.
- Vladan: The Serbian minstrel brought to the Battle of Kosovo to sing Serbian epics. After the battle, he flees Kosovo with Gjorg, Manolo, and a group of minstrels and fugitives.
- Manolo: a Walachian storyteller traveling with Gjorg and Vladan, who is invited with them to play in the lord's castle.
- The "Great Lady": an old woman attending the lord's banquet at which Gjorg, Vladan, and Manolo sing. She is very touched by their storytelling and asks that they sing at her funeral. She is found dead the next morning.

== Plot ==
The novel is split into three sections: 1) The Ancient Battle, 2) The Great Lady and 3) The Royal Prayer.

=== 1. The Ancient Battle ===
This section centers on Kadare's telling of the Battle of Kosovo, and the Balkan defeat. Serbian Prince Lazar leads the Balkan army, a group of alliances and scattered nationalities brought together by the King's strategical diplomacy. The united Balkan army faces the Ottoman Empire, intent on invading and conquering Kosovo. The night before the battle, the many Balkan princes gather together to hear their respective minstrels sing traditional epic poetry that details the history of each nation. The princes laugh at the minstrels, who sing about past wars against each other. Serbian minstrels, for instance, sing "“Serbs, to arms! The Albanians are taking Kosovo from us!” while the Albanian minstrels sing “A black fog has descended – Albanians, to arms, Kosovo is falling to the damned Serb.”

The next day, the Balkan army is defeated by the Ottoman Turks, although the Ottoman Sultan Murad I is killed in the battle. Prince Lazar is captured by the Ottomans.

=== 2. The Great Lady ===
This section portrays the aftermath of the Balkan defeat, through the perspective of two minstrels, one Albanian (Gjorg) and one Serbian (Vladan), forced to leave the battlefield together with the rest of the minstrels who had been at the battle. Despite the past conflict between Albania and Serbia, the two must unite and come to terms with the breakdown of the Balkan states. Both seem to be aware that failure to unite in the face of a common enemy was the cause of the Balkans' defeat.

The lost battle weighs heavily on both minstrels, Vladan even throwing away his gusla in despair. In their journey, the minstrels pick up a group of Hungarian fugitives, on the run from the battle. The fugitives ask the minstrels what it was like to sing for the many princes before the battle, and the minstrels respond that their divisive songs garnered laughs. As Hungarians, the fugitives do not understand the immense conflict between Albania and Serbia, and the reasons for this laughter. In a gesture of unity, Gjorg allows Vladan to play his lahuta, the Albanian version of a gusla, having lost his own instrument.

One fugitive with the group turns out to be a Turk, who only wishes to convert to Christianity, without fully renouncing his Islamic faith. For attempting to have two faiths, the man is burned at the stake.

One day, Gjorg, Vladan, and Manolo are invited to a castle whose lord wishes to hear them sing. Upon hearing their songs, still calling for war against each other, the lord denounces them. But one old lady begs that the guests to not insult the minstrels and instead asks them to tell the room a story, which she enjoys very much. The next morning, she is found dead and the minstrels are asked to sing at her funeral.

=== 3. The Royal Prayer ===
The final section is told from the point of view of Sultan Murad I, as he lies dead in his grave on the Field of the Blackbirds where the Battle of Kosovo took place. He curses the Balkans for forcing him to rest on their land, rather than the land he calls home. As the centuries pass, the Sultan notes that rather than attempting to unite and "build something together" the Albanians and Serbians continue to wage wars over Kosovo.

== Themes ==
- Call for Western intervention in the affairs of the Balkans
- The immortalization of ancient history through oral traditions like epic poetry

== Publication history ==
Kadare published the original, Albanian novel in 1998, with the title Elegji për Kosovën.

It was translated into English by Peter Constantine and published by Arcade Pub. in 2000.
