= Antonina Pirozhkova =

- Born: July 1, 1909; Krasny Yar, Tomsk Governorate, Siberia
- Died: September 12, 2010 (aged 101); Sarasota, Florida
- Citizenship: Soviet, American
- Education: Tomsk Polytechnic University
- Spouse: Isaac Babel
- Engineering career
- Discipline: Civil Engineering
- Institutions: Moscow State University of Railway Engineering
- Projects: Moscow Metro

Antonina Pirozhkova (1 July 1909 – 12 September 2010) was a Soviet civil engineer and writer, best known for her contributions to the construction of the Moscow Metro and the preservation of the literary legacy of her husband Isaac Babel.

== Early life and education ==
Antonina Nikolaevna Pirozhkova was born on 1 July 1909 in the village of Krasny Yar, Tomsk Governorate, Siberia. Her father died when she was fourteen, and she helped support her family by tutoring children at mathematics. In 1926, she joined Tomsk Polytechnic University to study construction and engineering, graduating four years later.

== Relationship with Isaac Babel ==
In 1932, Pirozhkova met the writer Isaac Babel. They began to live together in 1934 and had a daughter Lidiya in 1937. Babel was separated from his wife, and he did not enter into a formal marriage with Pirozhkova. However, following his death, the Soviet authorities recognised her as his heir.

Babel was executed at the Lubyanka on 27 January 1940. Neither his mother nor Pirozhkova was informed that he was in a Siberian gulag. Pirozhkova received confirmation of his death only in 1954, and even then was told that he had died in 1941 during the Second World War. Babel's papers including manuscripts, notebooks and his letters to her, were confiscated by the NKVD. Their fate remains unknown.

== Career ==
In 1930, Pirozhkova was assigned to work at Kuznetskstroi, a metallurgical factory being built near Novokuznetsk. Her talents were so valued that the stationmaster of the local railway station was forbidden from selling her a ticket home. Following its construction, she transferred in 1934 to Moscow where she joined the Metroproekt, the institute responsible for the design and construction of the Moscow Metro. She rose to the rank of chief designer, and was responsible for some of the major stations in the network: Mayakovskaya, Revolution Square, Paveletskaya, Kievskaya, and Arbatskaya.

Pirozhkova and her daughter were evacuated during the war to Abkhazia. During the Second World War, Pirozhkova headed an engineering team building railway tunnels in the Caucasus. In the 1950s, she was involved in the design and construction of palatial houses in the resorts of Caucasus.

Pirozhkova then joined the faculty of the Moscow State University of Railway Engineering. Here she taught subway engineers, and in 1964 wrote the definitive textbook Tunnels and Subways.

== Later life ==
She retired in 1965, whereupon she began her struggle to rehabilitate Babel and to restore his literary legacy.

Following her retirement, she began to compile and edit extant literary material from Isaac Babel. In 1972, she published the recollections about him by, among others, Ilya Ehrenburg and Konstantin Paustovsky. In 1990, she published the two-volume edition of Babel's collected works, the only one available in the Russian language.

Pirozhkova's transcription of Babel's 1920 Diary was published in the US in 1995.

In 1996, she emigrated with Lidiya to the US.

Pirozhkova's memoir of Babel titled By His Side was published in 1996, while a second volume which covered the rest of her remarkable life appeared posthumously in 2013.

She died on 12 September 2010, aged 101, in Sarasota, Florida.

== Works ==
- Pirozhkova, Antonina, ed. (1972). И. Бабель: воспоминания современников. Советский писатель.
- Volkov, V.P.; Naumov, S.N.; Pirozhkova, A.N. (1975). Тоннели и метрополитены. Moscow: Transport.
- Pirozhkova, Antonina (1996). At His Side: The Last Years of Isaac Babel. New York: Steerforth. ISBN 978-1883642983.
- Pirozhkova, Antonina (2013). Я пытаюсь восстановить черты. О Бабеле – и не только о нем. ACT. ISBN 978-5170807185.
