= Grigory Kotovsky =

Soviet general (1881–1925)

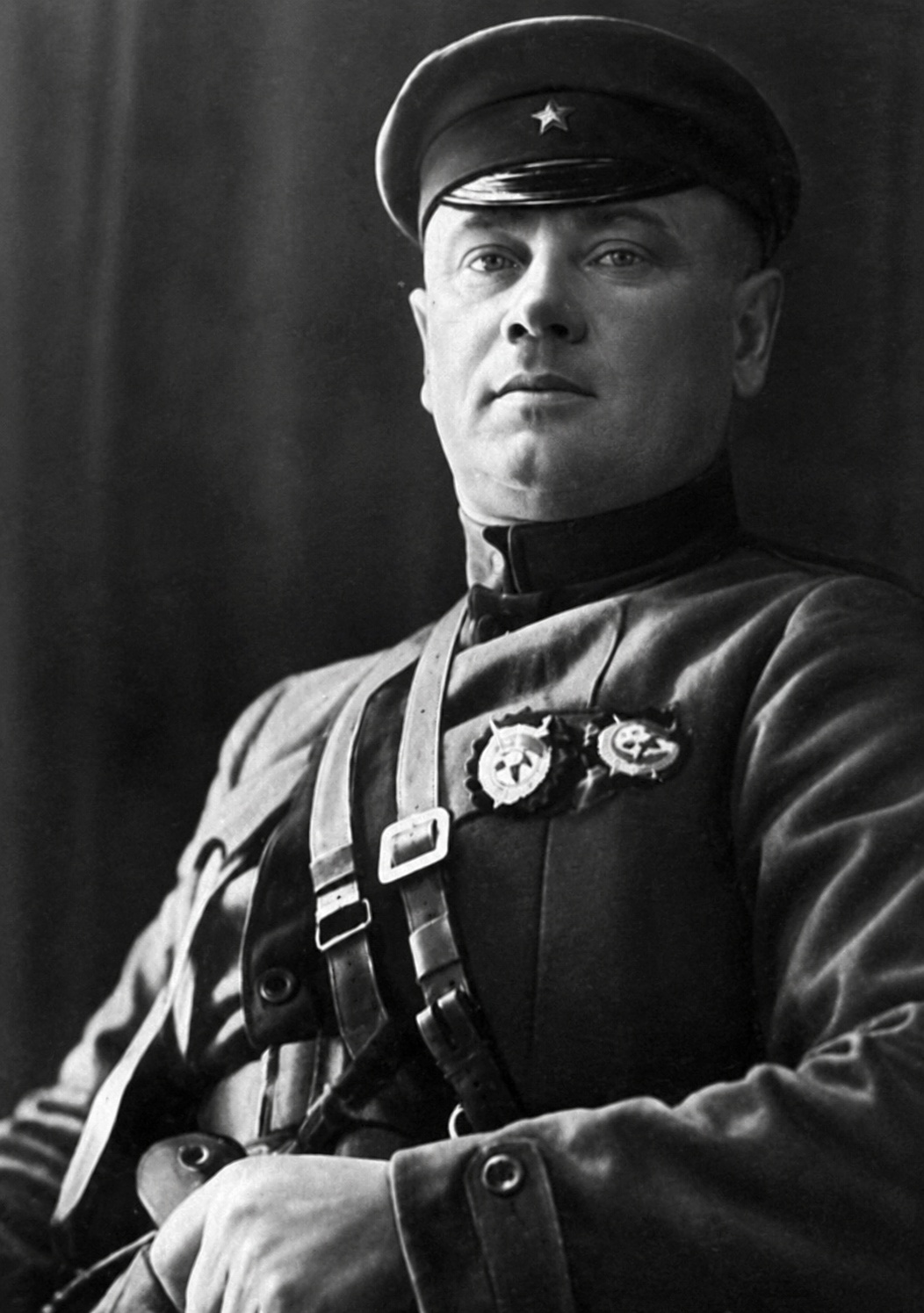
- Born: June 24, 1881; Hînceşti, Russian Empire
- Died: August 6, 1925 (aged 44); Chebanka Village, near Odessa, Soviet Union
- Military career
- Allegiance: Soviet Russia (1918–1922); Soviet Union (1922–1925)
- Branch: Red Army
- Service years: 1918–1925
- Commands: 17th Red Cossacks Cavalry Division; 2nd Cavalry Corps
- Conflicts: Russian Civil War
- Awards: Order of the Red Banner (3)

Grigory Ivanovich Kotovsky (Russian: Григо́рий Ива́нович Кото́вский, Ukrainian: Григорій Котовський, Romanian: Grigore Kotovski; 24 June [O.S. 12 June] 1881 – August 6, 1925) was a Soviet military officer and political activist, and participant in the Russian Civil War. He made a career from being a gangster and bank robber to eventually becoming a Red Army commander and member of the Central Executive Committee of the Soviet Union.

== Early life ==
Kotovsky was born in Hînceşti, Bessarabia Governorate, the son of a mechanical engineer. Officially, Kotovsky claimed to be born in 1887. He also had five siblings. His father was a Russian citizen of Polish descent and his mother an ethnic Russian. By ancestry, Kotovsky hailed from an aristocratic Polish family from Kamyanets-Podilsky. His grandfather, because of connections with members of the Polish uprising, was dismissed from Russian service and eventually went bankrupt. His father was forced to move to Bessarabia and become a Russian burgess. Kotovsky suffered from a marked stuttering and was left-handed. At the age of 2, he lost his mother and, at 16, his father. Kotovsky was raised by his godmother, Sophia Challe, the daughter of a Belgian engineer and friend of Kotovsky's father, and a godfather, the landowner Manuk-bey. Manuk-bey aided and supported Kotovsky's enrollment and stay at the Cucuruzeni Agricultural College. He intended eventually to send his godson to Germany for advanced agricultural courses, but his dreams were cut short by his death in 1902.

While studying at the agricultural college, Kotovsky became involved with the local political club of Socialist Revolutionaries. After graduation in 1900 he began work as an assistant to an estate manager, but not for long. Kotovsky was fired for various acts of theft, fraternization, and other misdeeds. With the start of the Russo-Japanese War, he failed to report to his military draft processing station. In 1905, he was arrested for evasion of military service and sent to the 19th Kostroma Infantry Regiment, headquartered in Zhytomyr.

He soon deserted from the military and organized his own band of robbers, conducting raids and setting estates on fire. He was generally sheltered and supported by the peasants, who regarded him as a sort of Robin Hood. On January 18, 1906, Kotovsky was finally arrested, but managed to escape after six months in the Chisinau prison. On September 24, 1906, he was again arrested again and sentenced to 12 years of katorga. Kotovsky began serving his sentence at Nerchinsk katorga until 1911. He later spent more time in various prisons across the Russian Empire: (Yelizavetgrad Prison, Smolensk Prison, and Oryol Prison). At katorga, Kotovsky cooperated with prison authorities and was put in charge of a 10-man team of construction workers who were building a railroad. In 1913 he became a candidate for the amnesty commemorating the 300th anniversary of the Romanov dynasty. However, it was decided not to release bandits on the day of the amnesty, and on February 27, 1913, Kotovsky managed to escape from katorga and return home to Bessarabia.

At first he lived in secrecy, working as a loader and worker doing unskilled, heavy jobs. He then became the leader of a local criminal gang of raiders. One of his most notorious feats was the successful theft of the State Treasury office in Bender, Moldova. On June 25, 1916, Kotovsky was unable to escape from police after another raid. He was surrounded by a squad of secret police and, after being wounded in the chest, he was arrested. The Odessa Military District court sentenced him to capital punishment and death by hanging. On death row, Kotovsky wrote letters of repentance and begged to be sent to the front lines. Upon the abdication of Nicholas II, a riot took place at Odessa prison after which the prison became self-governed by inmates; the Russian Provisional Government announced a wide political amnesty for all prisoners to be released.

== Revolutionary days ==
During the last part of World War I, Kotovsky was sent to the Romanian front. In 1918, he sided with the Communists in Tiraspol, taking command of a revolutionary battalion. Throughout 1919 he fought in Southern Ukraine, leading a Bolshevik partisan detachment against the army of the Ukrainian People's Republic and Denikin's forces. In 1920 Kotovsky joined the Russian Communist Party (Bolsheviks) and fought as part of Soviet cavalry in the Polish-Soviet War, advancing to Lviv. He then was put in charge of fighting Ukrainian insurgents. On 18 May 1920 Kotovsky barely evaded capture during a battle with Petro Dyachenko's Black Zaporozhian regiment. In September 1920 Kotovsky's forces suffered a defeat in fight against the Black Zaporozhians near Haluzyntsi.

In late 1921 Kotovsky's unit played a decisive role in the defeat of Ukrainian troops participating in the Second Winter Campaign. On 17 November his 9th Soviet cavalry division surrounded a column of Ukrainian guerrilla fighters near the village of Mali Mynky near Korosten and forced them to surrender. Kotovsky personally questioned the prisoners at a local church; those who refused to join the Red Army were executed on 21 November at Bazar. Kotovsky's signature stood under a Cheka resolution, approving the summary execution of 359 Ukrainian soldiers captured by his force.

== Later career and death ==
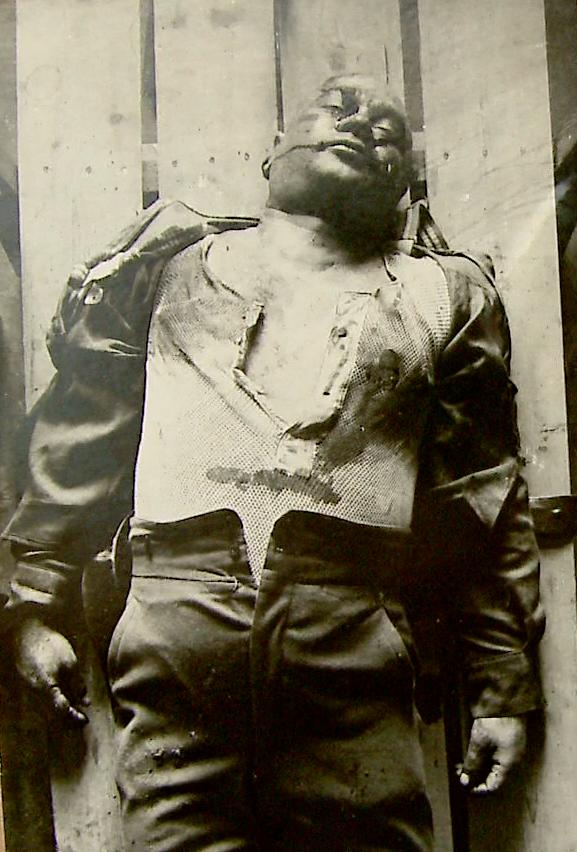
Kotovsky's body after the murder

In 1924, along with Mikhail Frunze, Kotovsky initiated the foundation of the Moldavian Autonomous Soviet Socialist Republic, centered in Balta, as part of the Ukrainian SSR. The new republic was seen by them as a bridgehead for Soviet expansion in Bessarabia and the Balkans.

Kotovsky was to play himself in the 1926 Soviet propaganda film P.K.P., but this was prevented by his death.

In 1925 Kotovsky was killed during a vacation in the sovkhoz Chabanka near Odessa by his deputy and friend Seider Meyer.

== Burial and commemoration ==
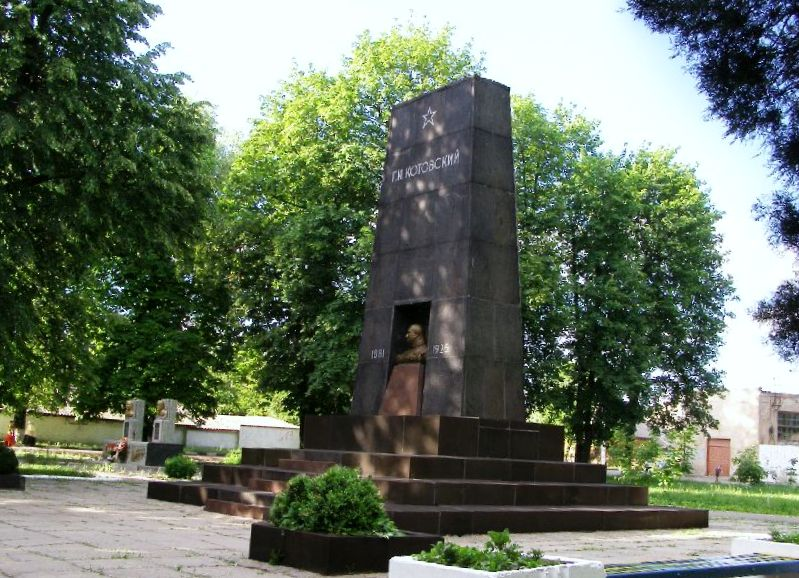
Kotovsky Mausoleum in Kotovsk in 2008. It was attacked and looted in September 2016.

Kotovsky's body was mummified and buried in a mausoleum in the town of Birzula (modern Odessa Oblast), which was renamed Kotovsk in 1935. The mausoleum was destroyed by Romanian troops during World War II, with Kotovsky's remains being thrown into a trench used for burials of executed people. It was restored in 1966, and Kotovsky's supposed remains were returned to the structure.

In May 2016 Kotovsk was renamed Podilsk and Kotovsk Raion — Podilsk Raion in order to comply with the 2015 laws prohibiting names of Communist origin. In September 2016 the city council of Podilsk adopted a decision to remove Kotovsky's remains from the mausoleum and inter them at a local cemetery.

Two other towns in the Soviet Union were also named Kotovsk. One of them was Kotovsky's native Hînceşti, which regained its former name in 1990. The other one is in Tambov Oblast, Russia.

== In literature ==
Kotovsky appears as an important character in the novel "Chapayev and Void" by postmodern Russian writer Viktor Pelevin. In this novel, Kotovsky is shown as a man who talks about philosophical questions and is addicted to cocaine.

== See also ==
- Mishka Yaponchik
- Sholem Schwarzbard
