= Mishka Yaponchik =

Russian gangster and military commander (1891–1919)

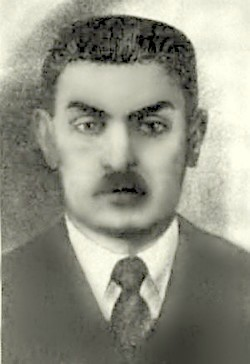
- Born: Moishe-Yakov Volfovich Vinnitsky; 30 October 1891; Golta, Russian Empire
- Died: 29 July 1919 (aged 27) near Voznesensk, Ukrainian SSR
- Military career
- Branch: Red Army
- Service years: 1904–1918
- Commands: 54th Soviet Revolutionary Regiment
- Conflict: Russian Civil War; Ukrainian-Soviet War

Moishe-Yakov Volfovich Vinnitsky (Note: Also transliterated as Moishe-Iakov.) (Russian: Мойше-Яков Вольфович Винницкий; 30 October 1891 – 29 July 1919), popularly known as Mishka Yaponchik (Russian: Мишка Япончик, lit. 'Mishka the Japanese'), was a Russian-Jewish gangster from Odessa and a military commander during the Russian Civil War.

After receiving an amnesty by the Russian Provisional Government in 1917, Yaponchik started a gang which came to control much of Odessa. Immediately following Odessa's occupation by Entente forces in 1918, he came into contact with the Bolshevik underground, notably Leonid Utyosov, who vouched for his character, which later allowed him to join the Red Army and form his own unit in 1919.

Many aspects of his life are unclear up to the present day, especially his death, with some suggestions he disappeared after trying to return to Odessa after his units allegedly mutinied and one where he was executed by the Cheka.

Yaponchik's memory has remained alive for many decades even after his disappearance, resulting in his likeness being used in literature, most notably the character Benya Krik in Odessa Stories, and a 2011 television series depicting his life, The Life and Adventures of Mishka Yaponchik.

== Early years ==
Moishe-Yakov Volfovich Vinnitsky was born into the family of a Jewish wagon-builder, Meyer-Volf Mordkovich Vinnitsky, according to some records in the stanitsa Golta (now within Pervomaisk). Vinnitsky was around four years old when his family moved to Odessa, in the Moldavanka section. Other records state that he was born into the family of a seaport serviceman (bindyuzhnik), at 23 Hospital Street in Odessa. Vinnitsky's mother, Doba Zelmanovna, gave birth to five sons and a daughter. Upon his birth he received a double name, Moisey-Yakov (Moses-Jacob), similar to his father. Because such a double name was uncommon in Russian culture, Vinnitsky's second name was sometimes recorded as the paternal name—Moisey Yakovlevich. Sometime in 1897, Mishka lost his father.

At first he worked at a mattress factory as a trainee, while also attending the Jewish school (presumably a cheder). Later, as an electrician, he received a job at the Anatra factory. At the time of the Odessa pogroms in October 1905, Vinnitsky participated in the Jewish self-defense. Later, he joined an organization of anarchists-communists called Molodaya Volya (Young Will). It was probably during that time that he received his famous street name, "Mishka the Japanese", presumably for the shape of his eyes. Another version suggests that he began to be recognized by this name after he narrated a story that he heard from a Portuguese sailor to his Odessa friends about a Japanese gang from Nagasaki. The story was about Japanese gangsters who set up rules for their "business" and never trespassed them. Yaponchik offered this example for his buddies to follow. According to one memoirist, he received the nickname after fighting in the Russo-Japanese War and returning with a Japanese wife. Although this has never been proven, it remains a popular legend.

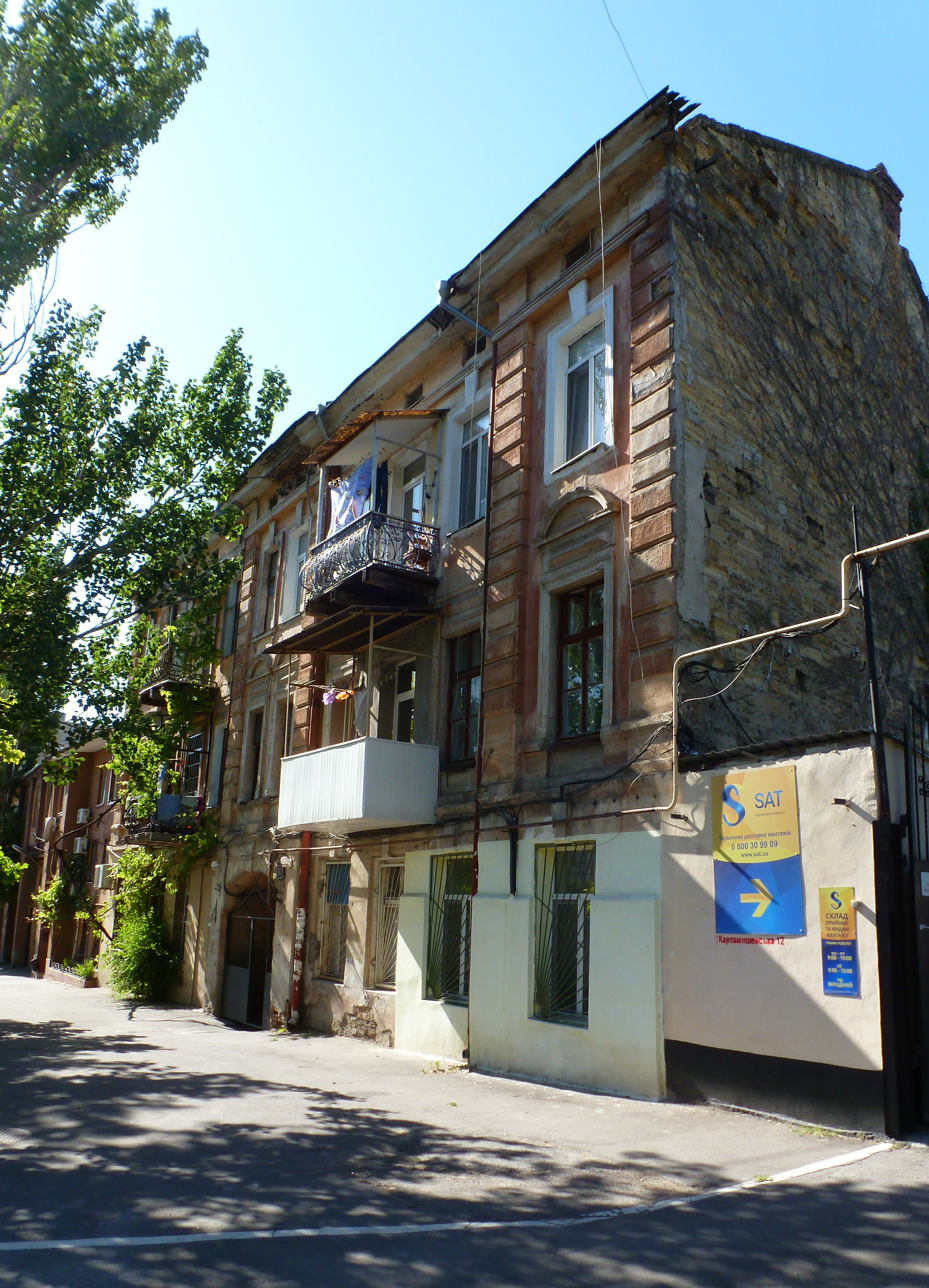
Apartment building of M.M. Kanela on Kartamyshevska Street No. 14 in the Moldavanka settlement in Odessa. Mishka Yaponchik and his gang used a hidden entrance into Odessa catacombs, which was located inside the courtyard of this building, to run from the police. The photo dated June 2017.

In 1907, Vinnitsky was sentenced to death by hanging for the assassination of the chief of the Mikhailov police precinct in Odessa, V. Kozhukhar. This sentence was later commuted to a term of 12 years' hard labor (katorga). According to legend, Vinnitsky made a special boot-shining box in which he placed explosives. Vinnitsky would sit on the corner of Dalnytska Street and Steep Street and ask passers-by if they wanted their boots cleaned. This activity irritated the chief of the local precinct. One day, however, a slightly-inebriated precinct chief placed his boot on the cleaning box. After cleaning his boots, Vinnitsky lit the explosives and managed to run away, leaving his client to face his end. While serving time, Vinnitsky became acquainted with Grigoriy Kotovskiy.

== Russian Civil War ==
Following an amnesty issued by the Russian Provisional Government in 1917, Yaponchik returned to Odessa, where he organized his gang to the extent of nearly taking control of the city. During the evacuation from the city of the last retreating Austrian and German forces on 12 December 1918, Yaponchik made a successful raid on the city jail freeing numerous detainees. During the occupation of Odessa by Entente forces (including French, Greek and British forces) in 1919, he cooperated with the Bolshevik underground (including Kotovskiy). Yaponchik was also well acquainted with Naftaly Frenkel and Lazar Veyssbeyn (Leonid Utyosov) who later became one of the most popular singers in the Soviet Union and vouched for Yaponchik as a "humane gangster" who avoided killings and sponsored local artists. Once, to prevent his banditry, he was arrested by the counter-intelligence service, Nikolai Shilling, who belonged to Denikin's Volunteer Army.

After Odessa was taken by the Red Army, some evidence suggests him being in charge of an armored train to defeat the Nykyfor Hryhoriv's mutiny.

=== 54th Soviet Regiment ===
In May 1919, he was allowed to form his own military unit for the Soviet forces that fell under the command of the 3rd Ukrainian Soviet Army. The unit was later reformed into the 54th Lenin's Soviet Revolutionary Regiment. Yaponchik's assistant (adjutant) was Meyer Zayder, nicknamed Mayorchik (as diminutive of major), who later killed Grigoriy Kotovskiy in 1925. The regiment consisted of Odessa's former convicts, anarchist militia, and the newly mobilized students of the Novorossiya University. The Red Army forces of Yaponchik did not have a uniform, which was not uncommon in many military formations that were drafted by Bolsheviks. Many of them wore boaters and top hats; however, almost everyone considered to be honorary to wear what is known as telnyashka (sailor's shirt).

The regiment was reassigned to Kotovskiy's Brigade under the command of the 45th division led by a Bessarabian Jew, Iona Yakir. In July 1919, Yaponchik's forces were engaged in battle against the army of the Ukrainian People's Republic that were often exclusively associated with Symon Petliura, the Ukrainian national leader who led Ukraine's struggle for independence following the Russian Revolution of 1917. Yaponchik's men rendezvoused with the Ukrainians near the town of Birzula (later renamed Kotovsk), where they successfully managed to take the town of Vapnyarka in Podolia (near Vinnytsia), securing several military prisoners and trophies. However, after a counter-attack, the regiment fled and many soldiers deserted, although what happened afterward is unknown. There are some suggestions that the regiment mutinied, and, after securing a couple of trains, tried to return to Odessa. Another version of the story tells that the higher command tried to isolate Yaponchik from the rest of his troops and ordered him to head towards Kiev. Yaponchik, however (with a company-size security) did not go to Kiev, but rather turned towards Odessa. He was ambushed by the Cheka about a mile away from the town of Voznesensk and was killed in a clay quarry during the arrest by uyezd military commissar Nikifor Ursulov on 29 July 1919 at eight o'clock in the morning.

Later, by Order #296 of the 12th Army, Nikifor Ursulov was awarded the Order of the Red Banner.

== Popular culture ==
Yaponchik's cult of personality was so strong in Odessa that it was used as a prototype by Isaac Babel as Benya Krik in his Odessa Stories.

A Russian–Ukrainian biographic television series based on Yaponchik's life, The Life and Adventures of Mishka Yaponchik, also titled internationally as Once Upon a Time in Odessa, was released in 2011.

== See also ==
- Kartamyshevska Street

== Sources ==
- Briker, Boris (1994). "The Underworld of Benia Krik and I. Babel's "Odessa Stories"". Canadian Slavonic Papers / Revue Canadienne des Slavistes. 36 (1/2): 115–134. ISSN 0008-5006.
- Steinberg, Mark D. (13 November 2025). Moral Storytelling in 1920s New York, Odessa, and Bombay: Sex, Crime, Violence, and Nightlife in the Modern City. Bloomsbury Publishing. ISBN 978-1-350-51997-8.
