= Moldavanka =

Neighbourhood of Odesa, Ukraine

Coordinates: 46.478611°N 30.7125°E

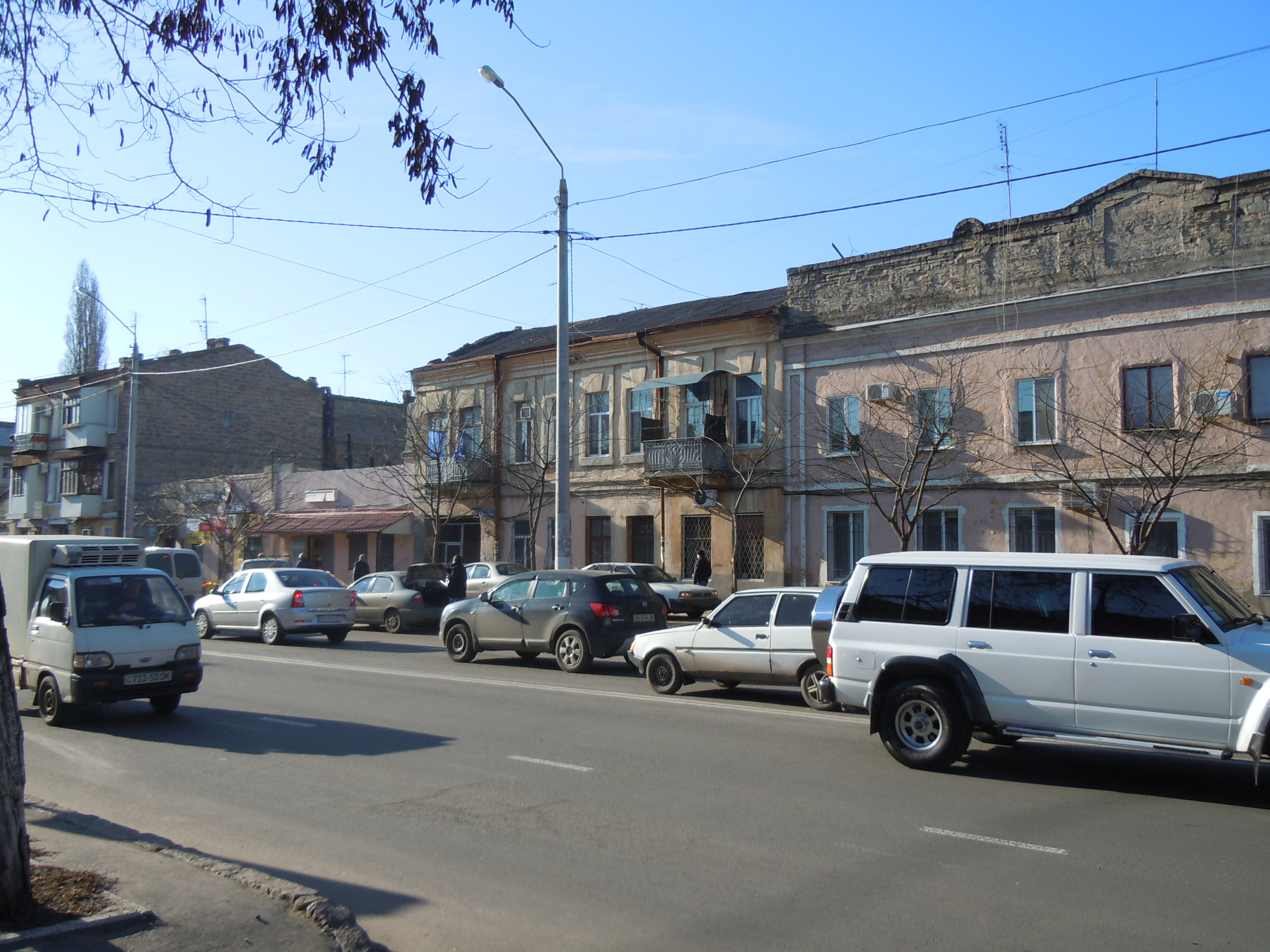
The typical architecture of Moldavanka

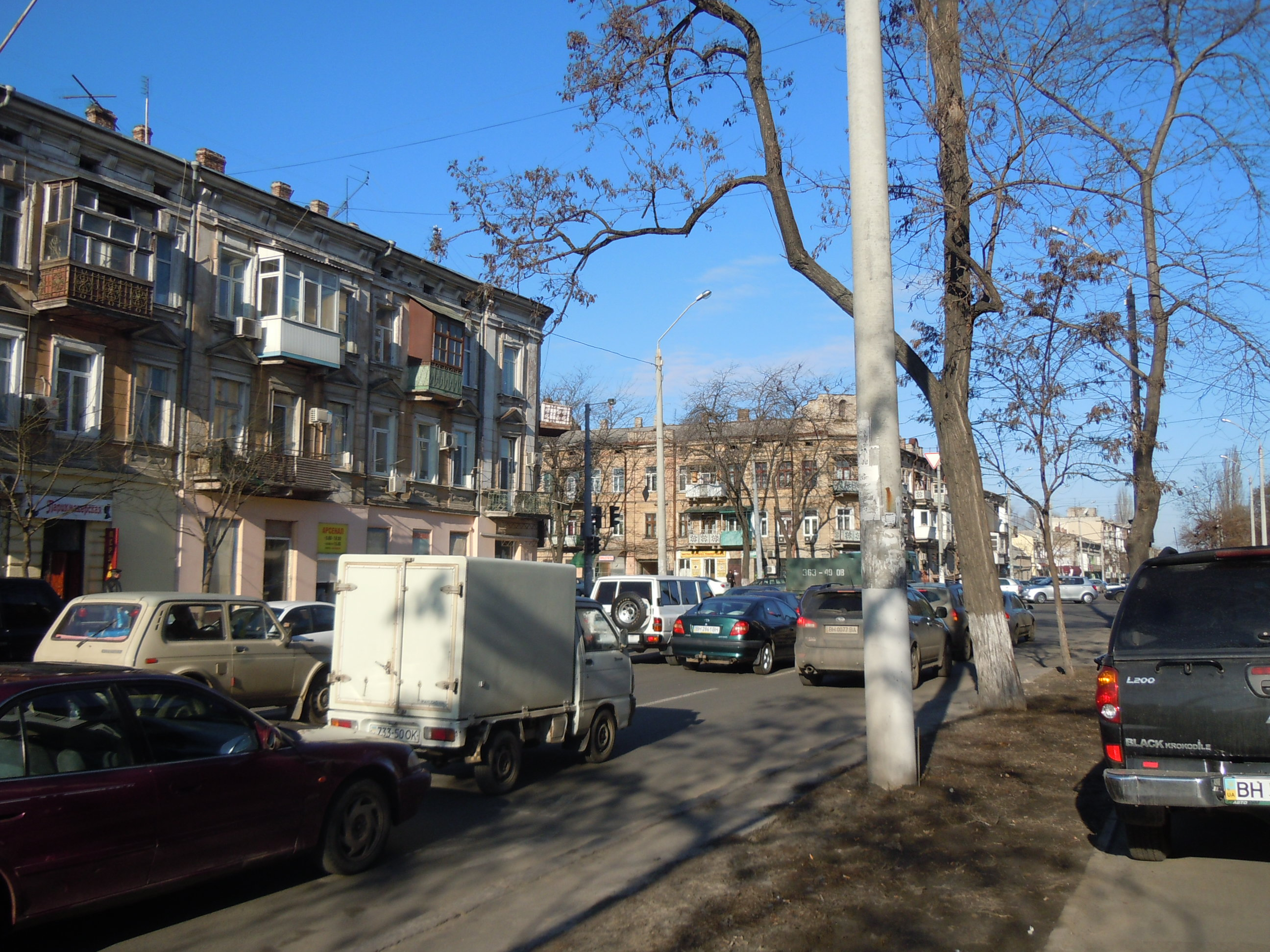
Miasoidivska Street, central street of Moldavanka

Moldavanka is a historical part of Odesa in the Odesa Oblast (province) of southern Ukraine, located jointly in Khadzhybeiskyi and Prymorskyi urban districts. Before 1820 it was a settlement just outside Odesa, which later engulfed it. Until the 20th century the neighborhood was considered a low-income/high-crime part of the town and was famous for its workers' shacks.

== History ==
The city of Odesa was officially founded in 1794 as an Imperial Russian naval fortress on the ruins of a former Ottoman fortress named Khadjibey (or Kotsiubiiv). By January 1795, the new name was mentioned for the first time in official correspondence.

However, adjacent to the new official locality, a certain Moldavian colony had already existed, which by the end of 18th century was an independent settlement known under the name of Moldavanka. Legend has it that the settlement predates Odesa by about thirty years and asserts that the locality was founded by Romanians who came to build the fortress of Yeni Dunia for the Ottomans and eventually settled in the area in the late 1760s, right next to the settlement of Khadjibey (since 1795 Odesa proper), on what later became the Prymorskyi Boulevard.

The Romanians owned relatively small plots on which they built village style houses and cultivated vineyards and gardens. What was to become Mikhailiv Square was the center of this settlement and the site of its first Orthodox church, the Church of the Dormition, built in 1821 close to the sea shore, as well as of a cemetery. Nearby were the military barracks and the country houses (dacha) of the city's wealthy residents, including that of the Duc de Richelieu, appointed by Czar Alexander I as Governor of Odesa in 1803. In the period from 1795 to 1814 the population of Odesa had increased 15 times and reached almost 20 thousand people. Colonists of various ethnicities settled mainly in the area of former Romanian colony, outside of the official boundaries, and as a consequence, in the first third of the 19th century, Moldavanka emerged as the dominant settlement. After planning by the official architects who designed buildings in Odesa's central district, such as Francesco Boffo and Giorgio Torricelli, Moldovanka was included in the general city plan, though the original grid-like plan of Moldovankan streets, lanes and squares remained unchanged.

• • •
I will not tell you for the whole Odesa,
All of Odesa is very big,
But Moldovanka and Peresyp
Just adore Kostya the sailor.

— M.Bernes, "Scows Full of Mullet" (1943)
- It looked like an industrial backyard of Odesa, where the plants and factories were located. The residents of this neighborhood were mostly the people who worked in those factories.
- Even in nowadays, Moldavanka's setting is mostly industrial. However, since some of the plants and factories are out of business today, they are demolished and high-rise living quarters and business centers take their places.

Prior to the Bolshevik Revolution of 1917, Moldavanka was the center of the city's Orthodox Jewish quarter. It is also the setting of the stories in The Odesa Tales and the play Sunset, both by Isaac Babel. The neighborhood also is mentioned by the Russian jazz song containing the slight local accent and performed by Mark Bernes "Chalands, that filled with grey mullets".

== Location ==
Moldavanka is located where the route M 16- E58 (Dalnytsia Street) intersects the route H 04 (Balkiv Street), in the vicinity of Mykhailiv Square. The better known route E95 just north of it runs into the Rozumovsky Street heading towards the shoreline eastward.

== See also ==
- Mishka Yaponchik, one of the most notorious (if not the most notorious) residents of the Moldavanka's Jewish Quarter.
- Benya Krik
