= Isaac Babel =

Russian writer and journalist (1894–1940)

Isaac Babel Исаак Бабель
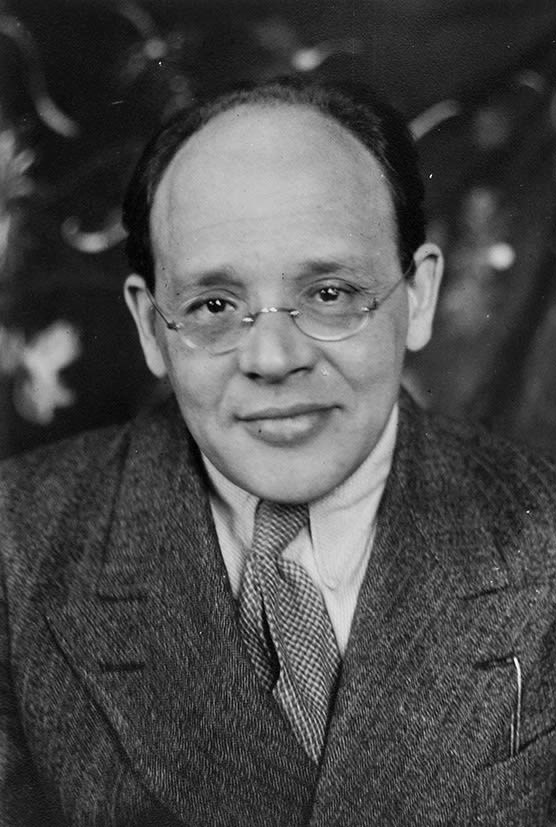
- Born: 13 July [O.S. 1 July] 1894; Odessa, Kherson Governorate, Russian Empire
- Died: 27 January 1940 (aged 45); Moscow, Russian SFSR, Soviet Union
- Occupations: Journalist; short story writer; playwright
- Writing career
- Notable works: Red Cavalry; Odessa Stories

Isaac Emmanuilovich Babel (Note: Russian: Исаак Эммануилович Бабель, romanized: Isaak Emmanuilovich Babel, Russian pronunciation: [ˈbabʲɪlʲ]; Ukrainian: Ісак Еммануїлович Бабель, romanized: Isak Emmanuilovych Babel.) (13 July [O.S. 1 July] 1894 – 27 January 1940) was a Russian and Soviet writer, journalist, playwright, and literary translator. He is best known as the author of Red Cavalry and Odessa Stories, and has been acclaimed as "the greatest prose writer of Russian Jewry". Babel was arrested by the NKVD on 15 May 1939 on fabricated charges of terrorism and espionage, and executed on 27 January 1940.

== Early years ==
Isaac Babel was born in the Moldavanka section of Odessa in the Russian Empire (present-day Ukraine), to Jewish parents, Manus and Feyga Babel. Soon after his birth, the Babel family moved to the port city of Nikolaev. They later returned to live in a more fashionable part of Odessa in 1906. Babel used Moldavanka as the setting for Odessa Stories and the play Sunset.

Although Babel's short stories present his family as "destitute and muddle-headed", they were relatively well-off. According to his autobiographical statements, Babel's father, Manus, was an impoverished shopkeeper. Babel's daughter, Nathalie Babel Brown, stated that her father fabricated this and other biographical details in order to "present an appropriate past for a young Soviet writer who was not a member of the Communist Party." In fact, Babel's father was a dealer in farm implements and owned a large warehouse.

In his pre-teens, Babel hoped to get into the preparatory class of the Nicholas I Odessa Commercial School. However, he first had to overcome the Jewish quota. Despite the fact that Babel received passing grades, his place was given to another boy, whose parents had bribed school officials. As a result, he was schooled at home by private tutors.

In addition to regular school subjects, Babel studied the Talmud and music. According to Cynthia Ozick,

Though he was at home in Yiddish and Hebrew, and was familiar with the traditional texts and their demanding commentaries, he added to these a lifelong fascination with Maupassant and Flaubert. His first stories were composed in fluent literary French. The breadth and scope of his social compass enabled him to see through the eyes of peasants, soldiers, priests, rabbis, children, artists, actors, women of all classes. He befriended whores, cabdrivers, jockeys; he knew what it was like to be penniless, to live on the edge and off the beaten track.

His attempt to enroll at Odessa University was blocked for ethnic reasons. Babel then entered the Kiev Institute of Finance and Business. There he met Yevgenia Borisovna Gronfein, daughter of a wealthy industrialist, whom he eventually married.

== Work ==
=== Early writings ===
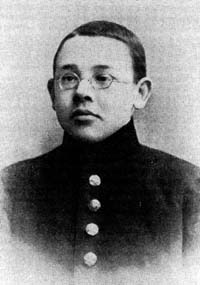
Isaac Babel in 1908

In 1915, Babel graduated and moved to Petrograd, in defiance of laws restricting Jews from living outside the Pale of Settlement. Babel was fluent in French, besides Russian, Ukrainian and Yiddish, and his earliest works were written in French. However, none of his stories in that language have survived.

In St. Petersburg, Babel met Maxim Gorky, who published some of Babel's stories in his literary magazine Letopis (Летопись, "Chronicle"). Gorky advised the aspiring writer to gain more life experience; Babel wrote in his autobiography, "I owe everything to that meeting and still pronounce the name of Alexey Maksimovich Gorky with love and admiration." One of his most famous semi-autobiographical short stories, "The Story of My Dovecote" (История моей голубятни, Istoriya moey golubyatni), was dedicated to Gorky.

There is very little information about Babel's whereabouts during and after the October Revolution. According to one of his stories, "The Road" ("Дорога", "Doroga"), he served on the Romanian front until early December 1917. In his autobiography, Babel says he worked as a translator for the Petrograd Cheka, likely in 1917. In March 1918 he worked in Petrograd as a reporter for Gorky's Menshevik newspaper, Novaya zhizn (Новая жизнь, "New Life"). Babel continued publishing there until Novaya zhizn was forcibly closed on Lenin's orders in July 1918.

Babel later recalled,

My journalistic work gave me a lot, especially in the sense of material. I managed to amass an incredible number of facts, which proved to be an invaluable creative tool. I struck up friendships with morgue attendants, criminal investigators, and government clerks. Later, when I began writing fiction, I found myself always returning to these "subjects", which were so close to me, in order to put character types, situations, and everyday life into perspective. Journalistic work is full of adventure.

=== October's Withered Leaves ===
During the Russian Civil War, which led to the Party's monopoly on the printed word, Babel worked for the publishing house of the Odessa Gubkom (regional CPSU Committee), in the food procurement unit (see his story "Ivan-and-Maria"), in the Narkompros (Commissariat of Education), and in a typographic printing office.

After the end of the Civil War, Babel worked as a reporter for The Dawn of the Orient (Заря Востока) a Russian-language newspaper published in Tbilisi. In one of his articles, he expressed regret that Lenin's controversial New Economic Policy had not been more widely implemented.

Babel married Yevgenia Gronfein on 9 August 1919, in Odessa, but by 1925, the Babels' marriage was souring. Yevgenia Babel, feeling betrayed by her husband's infidelities and motivated by her increasing hatred of communism, emigrated to France. Babel saw her several times during his visits to Paris. During this period, he also entered into a long-term romantic relationship with Tamara Kashirina. A son they had together, Emmanuil Babel (1927-2000), was adopted by her future husband Vsevolod Ivanov and renamed Mikhail Ivanov. He eventually became a noted artist.

After the final break with Tamara, Babel briefly attempted to reconcile with Yevgenia and in 1929 they had a daughter Nathalie, later Nathalie Babel Brown, who in adulthood became a scholar of her father's life and editor of his work. In 1932, Babel met a Siberian-born Gentile named Antonina Pirozhkova (1909–2010). In 1934, after Babel failed to convince his wife to return to Moscow, he and Antonina began living together. In 1939, their common law marriage produced a daughter, Lydia Babel.

According to Pirozhkova,

Before I met Babel, I used to read a great deal, though without any particular direction. I read whatever I could get my hands on. Babel noticed this and told me, "Reading that way will get you nowhere. You won't have time to read the books that are truly worthwhile. There are about a hundred books that every educated person needs to read. Sometime I'll try to make you a list of them." And a few days later he brought me a list. There were ancient writers on it, Greek and Roman—Homer, Herodotus, Lucretius, Suetonius—and also all the classics of later European literature, starting with Erasmus, Rabelais, Cervantes, Swift, and Coster, and going on to 19th century writers such as Stendhal, Mérimée, and Flaubert.

=== Red Cavalry ===
In 1920, Babel was assigned to Komandarm (Army Commander) Semyon Budyonny's 1st Cavalry Army, witnessing a military campaign of the Polish–Soviet War of 1920. He documented the horrors of the war he witnessed in the 1920 Diary (Конармейский Дневник 1920 года, Konarmeyskiy Dnevnik 1920 Goda), which he later used to write Red Cavalry (Конармия, Konarmiya), a collection of short stories such as "Crossing the River Zbrucz" and "My First Goose". The horrific violence of Red Cavalry seemed to harshly contrast the gentle nature of Babel himself.

Babel wrote: "Only by 1923 I have learned how to express my thoughts in a clear and not very lengthy way. Then I returned to writing." Several stories that were later included in Red Cavalry were published in Vladimir Mayakovsky's LEF ("ЛЕФ") magazine in 1924. Babel's honest description of the brutal realities of war, far from revolutionary propaganda, earned him some powerful enemies. According to recent research, Marshal Budyonny was infuriated by Babel's unvarnished descriptions of marauding Red Cossacks and demanded Babel's execution without success. However, Gorky's influence not only protected Babel but also helped to guarantee publication. In 1929 Red Cavalry was translated into English by J. Harland and later was translated into a number of other languages.

Argentine author and essayist Jorge Luis Borges once wrote of Red Cavalry,

The music of its style contrasts with the almost ineffable brutality of certain scenes. One of the stories—"Salt"—enjoys a glory seemingly reserved for poems and rarely attained by prose: many people know it by heart.

=== Odessa Stories ===
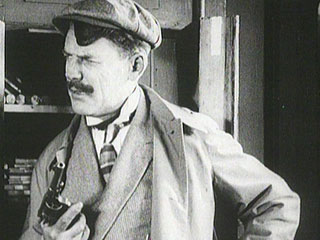
Benya Krik as portrayed by Yuri Shumsky in the 1926 movie of the same name

Back in Odessa, Babel started to write Odessa Stories, a series of short stories set in the Odessan ghetto of Moldavanka. Published individually between 1921 and 1924 and collected into a book in 1931, the stories describe the life of Jewish gangsters, both before and after the October Revolution. Many of them directly feature the fictional mob boss Benya Krik, loosely based on the historical figure Mishka Yaponchik. Benya Krik is one of the great anti-heroes of Russian literature. These stories were used as the basis for the 1927 film Benya Krik, and the stage play Sunset, which centers on Benya Krik's self-appointed mission to right the wrongs of Moldavanka. First on his list is to rein in his alcoholic, womanizing father, Mendel.

According to Nathalie Babel Brown,

Sunset premiered at the Baku Worker's Theatre on October 23, 1927, and played in Odessa, Kiev, and the celebrated Moscow Art Theatre. The reviews, however, were mixed. Some critics praised the play's 'powerful anti-bourgeois stance and its interesting 'fathers and sons' theme. But in Moscow, particularly, critics felt that the play's attitude toward the bourgeoisie was contradictory and weak. Sunset closed, and was dropped from the repertoire of the Moscow Art Theatre.

However, Sunset continued to have admirers. In a 1928 letter to his White emigre father, Boris Pasternak wrote, "Yesterday, I read Sunset, a play by Babel, and almost for the first time in my life I found that Jewry, as an ethnic fact, was a phenomenon of positive, unproblematic importance and power. ... I should like you to read this remarkable play..."

According to Pirozhkova, filmmaker Sergei Eisenstein was also an admirer of Sunset and often compared it to the writings of Émile Zola for, "illuminating capitalist relationships through the experience of a single family." Eisenstein was also quite critical of the Moscow Art Theatre, "for its weak staging of the play, particularly for failing to convey to the audience every single word of its unusually terse text."

=== Maria ===
Babel's play Maria candidly depicts both political corruption, prosecution of the innocent, and black marketeering within Soviet society. Noting the play's implicit rejection of socialist realism, Maxim Gorky accused his friend of having a "Baudelairean predilection for rotting meat." Gorky further warned his friend that "political inferences" would be made "that will be personally harmful to you." According to Pirozhkova,

Once Babel went to the Moscow Art Theater when his play Mariya was being given its first reading, and when he returned home he told me that all the actresses had been impatient to find out what the leading female role was like and who would be cast in it. It turned out that there was no leading female character present on the stage in this play. Babel thought that the play had not come off well, but ... he was always critical of his own work.

Although intended to be performed in 1935, the Maria's performance was cancelled by the NKVD during rehearsals. Despite its popularity in the West, Maria was not performed in Russia until after the dissolution of the Soviet Union.

Carl Weber, a former disciple of Bertolt Brecht, directed Maria at Stanford University in 2004.

According to Weber,

The play is very controversial. [It] shows the stories of both sides clashing with each other during the Russian Civil War – the Bolsheviks and the old society members – without making a judgment one way or another. Babel’s opinion on either side is very ambiguous, but he does make the statement that what happened after the Bolshevik Revolution may not have been the best thing for Russia.

== Life in the 1930s ==
In 1930, Babel travelled in Ukraine and witnessed the brutality of forced collectivisation and dekulakisation. Although he never made a public statement about this, he privately confided in Antonina,

The bounty of the past is gone—it is due to the famine in Ukraine and the destruction of the village across our land.

As Stalin tightened his grip on the Soviet intelligentsia and decreed that all writers and artists must conform to socialist realism, Babel increasingly withdrew from public life. During the campaign against "Formalism", Babel was publicly denounced for low productivity. At the time, many other Soviet writers were terrified and frantically rewrote their past work to conform to Stalin's wishes. However, Babel was unimpressed and confided in his protégé, the writer Ilya Ehrenburg, "In six months' time, they'll leave the formalists in peace and start some other campaign."

At the first congress of the Union of Soviet Writers (1934), Babel noted ironically, that he was becoming "the master of a new literary genre, the genre of silence." American Max Eastman describes Babel's increasing reticence as an artist in a chapter called "The Silence of Isaac Babyel" in his 1934 book Artists in Uniform. However, according to Nathalie Babel Brown, his life was tolerable:

The young writer burst upon the literary scene and instantly became the rage in Moscow. The tradition in Russia being to worship poets and writers, Babel soon became one of the happy few, a group that included Soviet writers who enjoyed exceptional status and privileges in an otherwise impoverished and despotic country. In the late 1930s, he was given a villa in the writer's colony of Peredelkino, outside Moscow. No secret was ever made of his having a wife and daughter in Paris. At the same time, hardly anyone outside of Moscow knew of two other children he had fathered. As a matter of fact, Babel had many secrets, lived with many ambiguities and contradictions, and left many unanswered questions behind him.

In 1932, after numerous requests, he was permitted to visit his estranged wife Yevgenia in Paris. While visiting his wife and their daughter Nathalie, Babel agonized over whether or not to return to Soviet Russia. In conversations and letters to friends, he expressed a longing of being "a free man," while also expressing fear at no longer being able to make a living solely through writing. On 27 July 1933, Babel wrote a letter to Yuri Annenkov, stating that he had been summoned to Moscow and was leaving immediately.

Babel's common-law wife, Antonina Pirozhkova, recalled this era,

Babel remained in France for so long that it was rumored in Moscow that he was never returning. When I wrote to him about this, he wrote back saying, "What can people, who do not know anything, possibly say to you, who knows everything?" Babel wrote from France almost daily. I accumulated many letters from him during his 11-month absence. When Babel was arrested in 1939, all of these letters were confiscated and never returned to me.

After his return to the Soviet Union, Babel decided to move in with Pirozhkova, beginning a common law marriage which would ultimately produce a daughter, Lidya Babel. He also collaborated with Sergei Eisenstein on the film Bezhin Meadow, about Pavlik Morozov, a child informant for the Soviet secret police. Babel also worked on the screenplays for several other Stalinist propaganda films.

According to Nathalie Babel Brown,

Babel came to Paris in the summer of 1935, as part of the delegation of Soviet writers to the International Congress of Writers for the Defense of Culture and Peace. He probably knew this would have been his last chance to remain in Europe. As he had done numerous times during the last ten years, he asked my mother to return with him to Moscow. Although he knew the general situation was bad, he nevertheless described to her the comfortable life that the family could have there together. It was the last opportunity my mother had to give a negative answer, and she never forgot it. Perhaps it helped her later on to be proven completely right in her fears and her total lack of confidence in the Soviet Union. My mother described to me these last conversations with my father many times.

== Arrest and execution ==
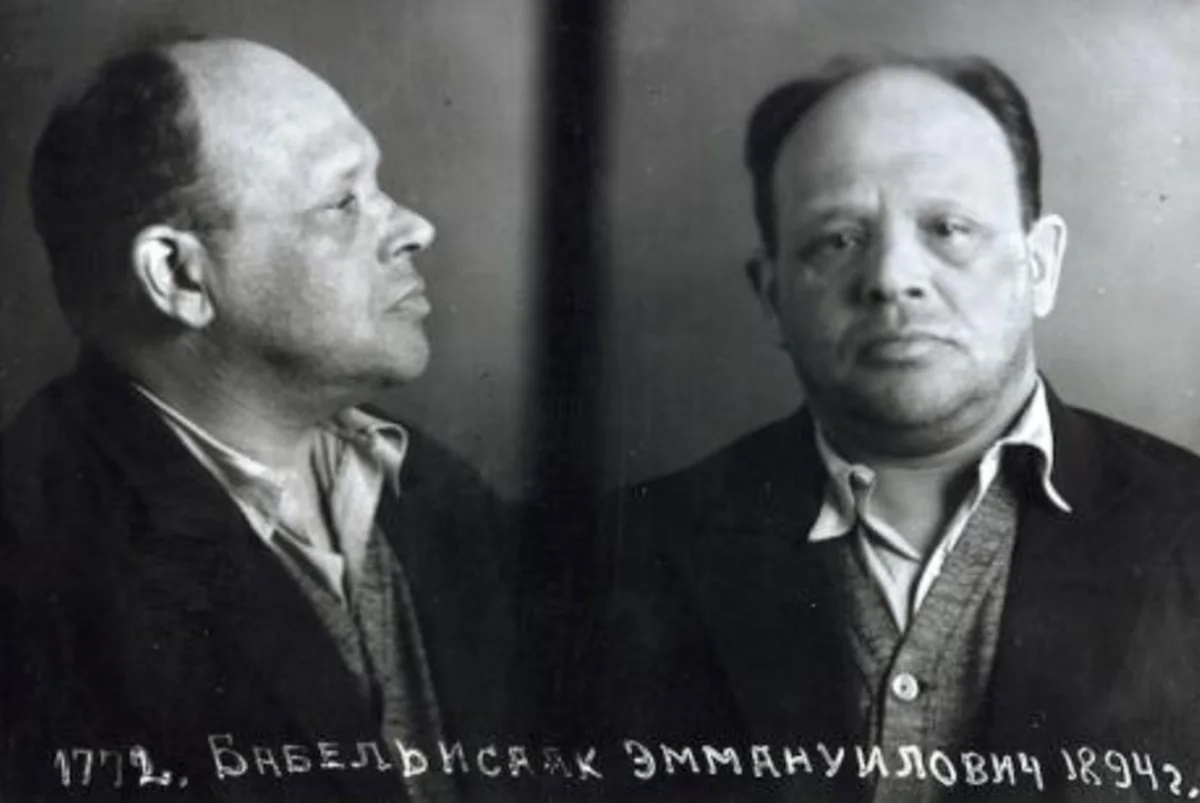
The NKVD photos of Babel taken after his arrest

On 15 May 1939, Antonina Pirozhkova was awakened by four NKVD agents pounding upon the door of their Moscow apartment. Although surprised, she agreed to accompany them to Babel's dacha in Peredelkino. Babel was then placed under arrest. According to Pirozhkova:

In the car, one of the men sat in back with Babel and me while the other one sat in front with the driver. 'The worst part of this is that my mother won't be getting my letters', and then he was silent for a long time. I could not say a single word. Babel asked the secret policeman sitting next to him, 'So I guess you don't get too much sleep, do you?' And he even laughed. As we approached Moscow, I said to Babel, 'I'll be waiting for you, it will be as if you've gone to Odessa... only there won't be any letters....' He answered, 'I ask you to see that the child not be made miserable.' "But I don't know what my destiny will be." At this point, the man sitting beside Babel said to me, "We have no claims whatsoever against you." We drove to the Lubyanka Prison and through the gates. The car stopped before the massive, closed door where two sentries stood guard. Babel kissed me hard and said, "Someday we'll see each other..." And without looking back, he got out of the car and went through that door.

According to Nadezhda Mandelstam, Babel's arrest became the subject of an urban legend within the NKVD. NKVD agents, she explains, were fond of "telling stories about the risks they ran" in arresting "enemies of the people". Babel had, according to NKVD lore, "seriously wounded one of our men" while "resisting arrest". Mrs. Mandelstam contemptuously declared, "Whenever I hear such tales I think of the tiny hole in the skull of Isaac Babel, a cautious, clever man with a high forehead, who probably never once in his life held a pistol in his hands."

According to Peter Constantine, from the day of his arrest, Isaac Babel "became a nonperson in the Soviet Union. His name was blotted out, removed from literary dictionaries and encyclopedias, and taken off school and university syllabi. He became unmentionable in any public venue. When the film director Mark Donskoi's famous Gorky trilogy premiered the following year, Babel, who had worked on the screenplay, had been removed from the credits."

According to his file, "Case #419, Babel, I.E.", the writer was held at the Lubyanka and Butyrka Prisons for a total of eight months as a case was built against him for Trotskyism, terrorism, and spying for Austria and France. At his initial interrogations, "Babel began by adamantly denying any wrongdoing, but then after three days he suddenly 'confessed' to what his interrogator was suggesting and named many people as co-conspirators. In all likelihood, he was tortured, almost certainly beaten." His interrogators included Boris Rodos, who had a reputation as a particularly brutal torturer, even by the standards of the time, and Lev Schwartzmann, who tortured the renowned theatre director Vsevolod Meyerhold. Among those he accused of conspiring with him were his close friends Sergei Eisenstein, Solomon Mikhoels, and Ilya Ehrenburg.

Despite months of pleading and letters sent directly to Beria, Babel was denied access to his unpublished manuscripts. In October 1939, Babel was again summoned for interrogation and denied all his previous testimony. A statement was recorded, "I ask the inquiry to take into account that, though in prison, I committed a crime. I slandered several people." This led to further delays as the NKVD frantically attempted to salvage their cases against Mikhoels, Ehrenburg, and Eisenstein.

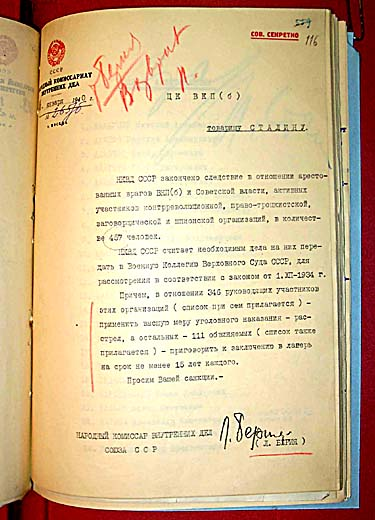

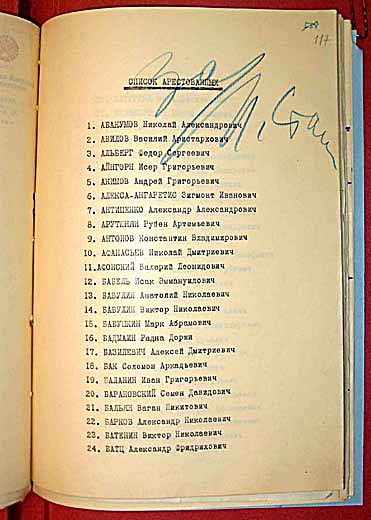

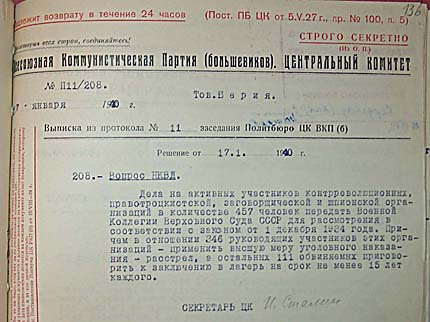

Left: Beria's January 1940 letter to Stalin, asking permission to execute 346 "enemies of the CPSU and of the Soviet authorities" who conducted "counter-revolutionary, right-Trotskyite plotting and spying activities." Middle: Stalin's handwriting: "За" (affirmative). Number 12 on the list is Isaac Babel. Right: The Politburo's decision is signed by Secretary Stalin.

On 16 January 1940, Lavrentiy Beria presented Stalin with a list of 457 'enemies of the party and the soviet regime' who were in custody, with a recommendation that 346, including Isaac Babel, should be shot. According to Babel's daughter, Nathalie Babel Brown, his trial took place on 26 January 1940, in one of Lavrenti Beria's private chambers. It lasted about twenty minutes. The sentence had been prepared in advance and without ambiguity: death by firing squad, to be carried out immediately. He was shot at 1:30 am on 27 January 1940.

Babel's last recorded words in the proceedings were:

I am innocent. I have never been a spy. I never allowed any action against the Soviet Union. I accused myself falsely. I was forced to make false accusations against myself and others... I am asking for only one thing—let me finish my work.

He was shot the next day, and his body was thrown into a communal grave. All of this information was revealed in the early 1990s. According to Simon Sebag Montefiore, Babel's ashes were buried with those of Nikolai Yezhov and several other victims of the Great Purge in a common grave at the Donskoy Cemetery. After the dissolution of the Soviet Union, a plaque was placed there which reads, "Here lie buried the remains of the innocent, tortured, and executed victims of political repressions. May they never be forgotten."

According to the early official Soviet version, Isaac Babel died in the Gulag on 17 March 1941. Peter Constantine, who translated Babel's complete writings into English, has described the writer's execution as "one of the great tragedies of 20th century literature."

== Rehabilitation ==
On 23 December 1954, during the Khrushchev thaw, a typed half sheet of paper ended the official silence. It read, "The sentence of the military collegium dated 26 January 1940 concerning Babel, I.E., is revoked on the basis of newly discovered circumstances and the case against him is terminated in the absence of elements of a crime."

Babel's works were once again widely published and praised. His public rehabilitation as a writer was initiated with the help of his friend and admirer Konstantin Paustovsky, and a volume of Babel's selected works was published in 1957 with a laudatory preface by Ilya Ehrenburg. New collections of selected works by Babel were published in 1966, 1989 and 1990. Still, certain "taboo" parts such as mentions of Trotsky were censored until the glasnost period shortly before the dissolution of the Soviet Union. The first collections of the complete works of Babel were prepared and published in Russia in 2002 and 2006.

== Lost writings ==
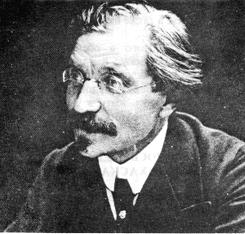
Sholem Aleichem, whose writings Babel translated into Russian

After his rehabilitation, Antonina Pirozhkova spent almost five decades campaigning for the return of Babel's manuscripts. These included Babel's translations of Sholem Aleichem's writings from Yiddish into Russian, as well as several unpublished short stories and novellas. According to Pirozhkova,

As Babel put it, he worked on Sholem Aleichem to "feed his soul." Other "food for the soul" came from writing new stories and the novella "Kolya Topuz." He told me, "I'm writing a novella in which the main character is a former Odessa gangster like Benia Krik. His name is Kolya Topuz and so far, at least, that's also the name of the novella. I want to show how this sort of man adapts to Soviet reality. Kolya Topuz works on a collective farm during collectivization, and then he goes to work in a Donbass coal mine. But since he has the mentality of a gangster, he's constantly breaking out of the limits of normal life, which leads to numerous funny situations." Babel spent a great deal of time writing, and he finished many works. Only his arrest prevented his new works from coming out."

However, even requests by Ilya Ehrenburg and the Union of Soviet Writers produced no answers from the Soviet State. The truth was not revealed until the advent of Perestroika.

According to Pirozhkova,

In 1987, when so much was changing in our country, I again made an official request that the KGB search for Babel's manuscripts in its underground storage areas. In response to my request, I was visited by two KGB agents who informed me that the manuscripts had been burned. "And so you've come in person to avoid giving me a written response to my request, am I correct?" "How could you think such a thing? We came here to commiserate. We understand how precious Babel's manuscripts would be."

== Legacy ==
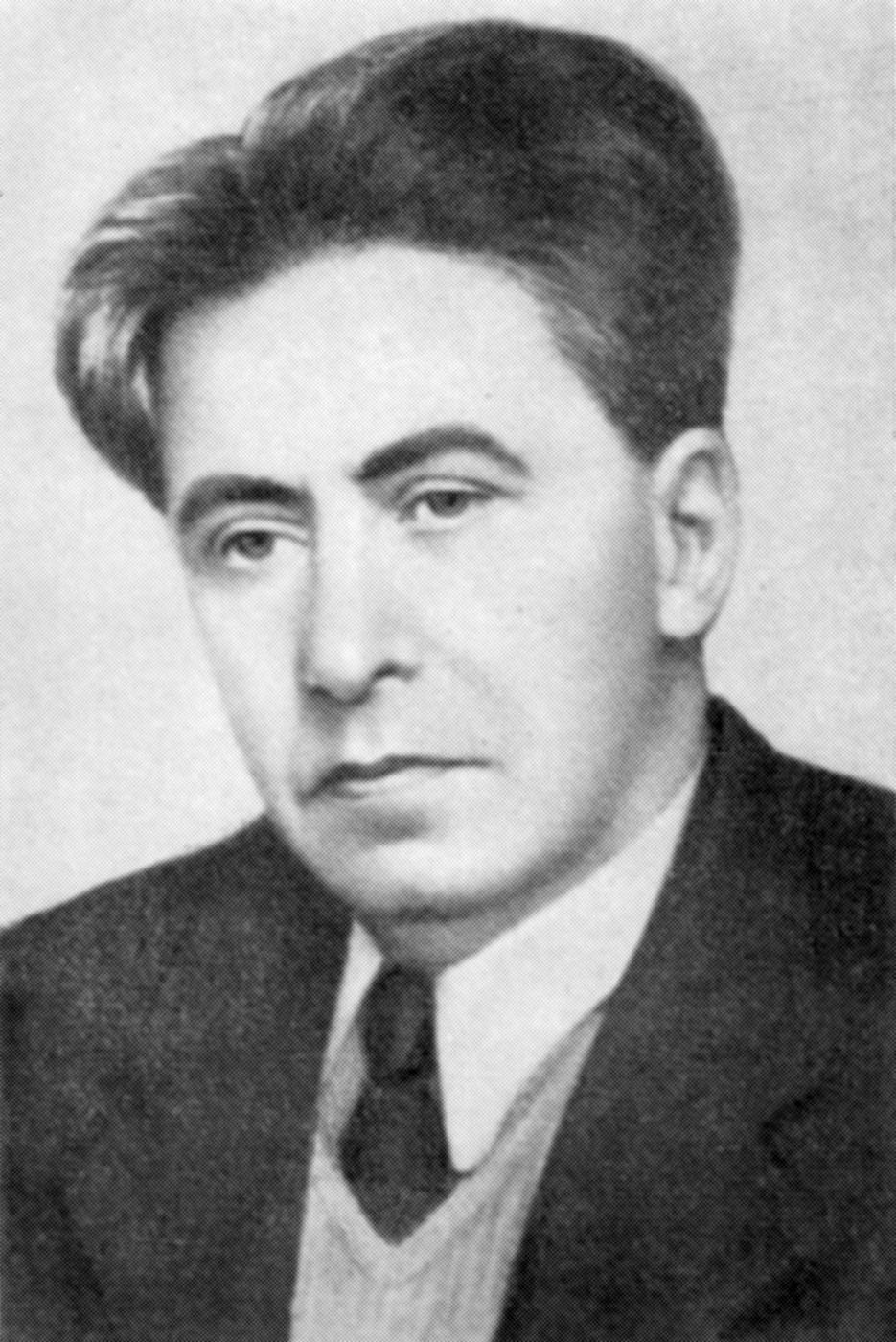
Soviet author and former Babel protégé Ilya Ehrenburg

According to John Updike, Maxim Gorky said to André Malraux that Babel was "the best Russia has to offer." A quarter of a century later, Babel's contemporary Konstantin Paustovsky wrote in his reminiscences, "He was, for us, the first really Soviet writer."

Judith Stora-Sandor, one of Babel's first biographers, wrote in 1968, that Babel's "literary sensibility was French, his vision Jewish, and his fate all too Russian."

After her husband's return to Moscow in 1935, Yevgenia Gronfein Babel remained unaware of his other family with Antonina Pirozhkova. Based upon statements made by Ilya Ehrenburg, Yevgenia further believed that her husband was still alive and living in exile. In 1956, however, Ehrenburg told her of her husband's execution while visiting Paris. After also informing Mrs. Babel of her husband's daughter with Antonina Pirozhkova, Ehrenburg asked Yevgenia to sign a false statement attesting to a pre-war divorce from her husband. Enraged, Yevgenia Babel spat in Ehrenberg's face and then fainted.

Her daughter, Nathalie Babel Brown, believes that Ehrenburg did this under orders from the KGB. With two potential contenders for the role of Babel's widow, the Soviet State clearly preferred Babel's common-law wife Antonina to his legal wife Yevgenia, who had emigrated to the West.

Although she was too young to have many memories of her father, Nathalie Babel Brown went on to become one of the world's foremost scholars of his life and work. When W.W. Norton published Babel's Complete Works in 2002, Nathalie edited the volume and provided a foreword. She died in Washington, D.C., in 2005.

Lydia Babel, the daughter of Isaac Babel and Antonina Pirozhkova, also emigrated to the United States and currently resides in Silver Spring, Maryland.

Although Babel's play Maria was very popular at Western European colleges during the 1960s, it was not performed in Babel's homeland until 1994. The first English translation appeared in 1966 in a translation by Michael Glenny in Three Soviet Plays (Penguin) under the title "Marya". Maria's American premiere, directed by Carl Weber, took place at Stanford University in 2004.

Several American writers have valued Babel's writings. Hubert Selby has called Babel "the closest thing I have to a literary influence." James Salter has named Babel his favorite short-story writer. "He has the three essentials of greatness: style, structure, and authority." George Saunders, when asked for a literary influence said "There's a Russian writer named Isaac Babel that I love. I can drop in anywhere in his works, read a few pages, and go, Oh yeah, language. It's almost like if you were tuning a guitar and you heard a beautifully tuned one and you say, Yeah, that's what we want. We want something that perfect. When I read him, it recalibrates my ear. It reminds me of the difference between an OK sentence and a really masterful sentence. Babel does it for me."

=== Memorials ===
An Isaac Babel memorial was unveiled on the north-west corner of the intersection of Rishelievska Street and Zhukovskoho Street in Odesa in early September 2011, and, in conjunction with the inauguration of the memorial, a commemorative reading of three of his stories held, with musical interludes from the works of Isaac Schwartz, in the Philharmonic Hall in Pushkinska Street on 6 September 2011. The city also has the Babelya Street in Moldavanka.

The memorial became a point of debate among residents of Odesa, as in 2024 the local administration decided to remove it, and a number of others, under the derussification law. Babel served in Bolshevik Red Army and some believe that he was a supporter of the Soviet collectivization policy (in fact, he was opposed to it) and argued for the removal of his statue, while others see him as an integral part of Odesa's cultural heritage and that removing the memorial would undercut Odesa's multicultural identity.

== Bibliography ==
=== Books ===
- Конармейский дневник 1920 года (written 1920, published 1990). 1920 Diary, trans. H. T. Willetts (1995, Yale University Press; ISBN 0-300-09313-6)
- Конармия (1926). Red Cavalry
- Закат (play, written 1926, performed 1927, published 1928). Sunset
- Одесские рассказы (published individually 1921–1924, collected in 1931). Odessa Stories
- Мария (play, written mid-1930s, not performed in USSR). Maria

=== Short stories ===
- "Story of My Dovecote" (1925)
- "Crossing the Zbruch" (as "I. Babiel") (1926)

=== Screenplays and film collaborations ===
- Salt (1925). Directed by Pyotr Chardynin; short film based on the short story of the same name.
- Jewish Luck (1925). Directed by Alexander Granovsky; based on screenplay from Sholem Aleichem with intertitles by Babel.
- Беня Крик (1926, screenplay). Benya Krik (1927), directed by Vladimir Vilner, filmed in Ukraine and available on DVD from National Center for Jewish Film. Translation of screenplay published as Benia Krik: A Film-Novel, trans. Ivor Montagu and S. S. Nolbandov (1935).
- Wandering Stars (1926, screenplay). Directed by Grigori Gritscher-Tscherikower in 1927; based on the novel by Sholem Aleichem with the same name
- Jimmie Higgins (1928). Directed by Georgi Tasin, screened in 1929; based on the novel by Upton Sinclair.
- The Chinese Mill (1928)
- Old Square, No. 4 (written in 1939)

=== Posthumous compilations ===
- Benya Krik, the Gangster and Other Stories, ed. Avrahm Yarmolinsky, with translations by Walter Morison, Bernard Guilbert Guerney and the editor (Schocken, 1948)
- The Collected Stories, trans. Walter Morison and others (1955)
- Lyubka the Cossack and Other Stories, trans. Andrew R. MacAndrew (1963)
- The Lonely Years: 1925–1939: Unpublished Stories and Correspondence, ed. Nathalie Babel, trans. Andrew R. MacAndrew and Max Hayward (Farrar, Straus & Company, 1964)
- You Must Know Everything, Stories 1915–1937, ed. Nathalie Babel, trans. Max Hayward (Farrar, Straus and Giroux, 1969)
- The Forgotten Prose, ed. and trans. Nicholas Stroud (Ardis, 1978)
- Collected Stories, trans. David McDuff (Penguin, 1994)
- The Complete Works of Isaac Babel, trans. Peter Constantine, ed. Nathalie Babel, intro. Cynthia Ozick (Norton, 2002)
- Odessa Stories, trans. Boris Dralyuk (Pushkin Press, 2016)
- The Essential Fictions, trans. Val Vinokur (Northwestern University Press, 2017)
- Of Sunshine and Bedbugs: Essential Stories, trans. Boris Dralyuk (Pushkin Press, 2022)

== In popular culture ==
British writer Bernard Kops wrote a poem, and later a play, about Babel: "Whatever Happened to Isaac Babel?"

Brazilian writer Rubem Fonseca wrote a novel about the search for a lost manuscript from Babel: "Vastas emoções e pensamentos imperfeitos" (1988).

American author Travis Holland wrote his debut novel "The Archivist's Story” about an archivist, Pavel Dubrov, in Lubyanka Prison who has to authenticate a Babel manuscript. In the novel his meeting with Babel prompts him to save the story at great risk to himself.

Playwright Rajiv Joseph won an Obie Award for Best New American Play for his 2017 Describe the Night, which follows Babel from his role as a journalist in Poland through and beyond his execution, and the role his personal journal plays in uniting people across time and place.
