= Peter Constantine =

British and American literary translator (born 1963)

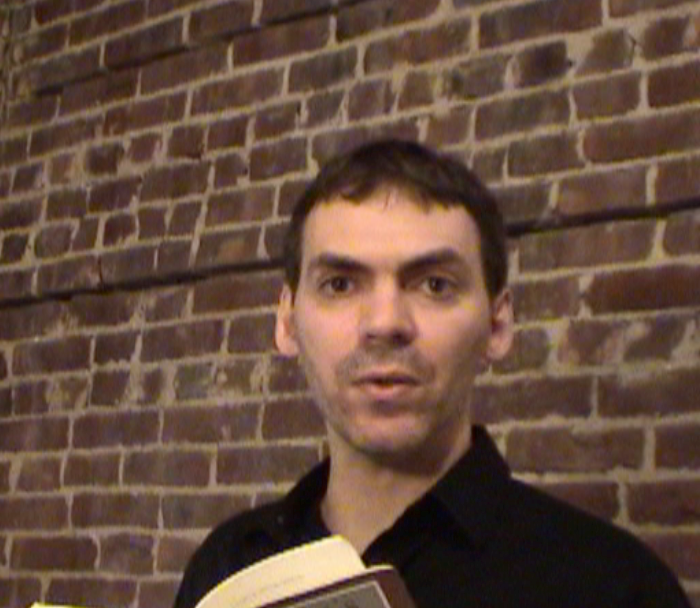
- Peter Constantine, 2009
- Born: 1963 (age 62–63); London, England
- Occupation: Literary translator
- Notable work: Thomas Mann: Six Early Stories; The Undiscovered Chekhov; The Complete Works of Isaac Babel
- Awards: PEN/Book-of-the-Month Club Translation Prize (1998); National Translation Award (1999); Koret Jewish Book Award (2002); National Jewish Book Award citation (2002); Hellenic Association of Translators of Literature Prize (2005); Helen and Kurt Wolff Translator's Prize (2007)

Peter Constantine (born 1963) is a British-born American literary translator who has translated literary works from German, Russian, French, Modern Greek, Ancient Greek, Italian, Albanian, Dutch, and Slovene.

== Biography ==
Constantine was born in London to an Austrian mother and a British father of Turkish and Greek descent. He grew up in Athens, Greece before moving to the United States in 1983. In his first books, Japanese Street Slang and Japanese Slang: Uncensored he explored Japanese slang and criminal jargons in their many varieties, focusing on aspects of the Japanese language that had been traditionally marginalised. "Previously unprintable things that will inform, amuse, shock and maybe even disgust" (Joseph LaPenta: Daily Yomiuri, 6 December 1992).

In the early 1990s, Constantine began translating short stories and poetry from various European languages, publishing in literary magazines in the United States, Britain, and Australia. Since the publication of his first book-length translation, Thomas Mann: Six Early Stories, he has worked almost exclusively as a literary translator.

Contemporary Authors quotes Constantine: "I have always been interested in language in all its aspects. Working with master linguists such as Thomas Mann, Chekhov, Dostoevsky, and Babel has been particularly rewarding for me, since these writers push language to an extreme, and the translator has to vigorously mold the translation in order to try to recreate their effects."

== Honors ==
In 1998, Constantine received the PEN/Book-of-the-Month Club Translation Prize for his translation of Thomas Mann's Six Early Stories. It was chosen by The New York Times as a Notable Book of the Year. In 1999 he was awarded the National Translation Award for The Undiscovered Chekhov: Thirty-Eight New Stories. In 2002, Constantine's translation of The Complete Works of Isaac Babel, edited by Nathalie Babel, received a Koret Jewish Book Award and a National Jewish Book Award citation. His translation of the modern Greek poet Stylianos Harkianakis's poetry book Mother received the 2004–2005 Hellenic Association of Translators of Literature Prize. In 2007 Constantine was the recipient of the Helen and Kurt Wolff Translator's Prize for his translation of Benjamin Lebert's novel The Bird Is a Raven. His translation of The Essential Writings of Machiavelli was a finalist for the 2008 PEN/Book-of-the-Month Club Translation Prize. Peter Constantine is a 2012 Ellen Maria Gorrissen Berlin Prize Fellow at the American Academy in Berlin. In 2016, Constantine received an honorary doctorate, Doctor of Humane Letters, from the University of Connecticut.

== Translator ==
- Deichmann, Hans; Constantine, Peter (with Peter Glassgold) (1997). Objects: A Chronicle of Subversion in Nazi Germany and Fascist Italy. New York: Marsilio Publishing. ISBN 1-56886-048-X.
- Mann, Thomas; Constantine, Peter (1997). Six Early Stories. Los Angeles: Sun and Moon Press. ISBN 1-55713-298-4.
- Grass, Gunter; Constantine, Peter (1997). For Yasar Kemal. foreword by Vanessa Redgrave. London: International Artists Against Racism. ISBN 0-9532451-0-1.
- Chekhov, Anton; Constantine, Peter (1998). The Undiscovered Chekhov: Thirty-Eight New Stories (Hard Cover). New York: Seven Stories Press. ISBN 1-888363-76-2.
- Küstenmacher, Werner; Constantine, Peter (1999). Frommer's Moon: A Guide For First-Time Visitors 1999. London: John Wiley & Sons. ISBN 0-02-862869-1.
- Chekhov, Anton; Constantine, Peter (2000). The Undiscovered Chekhov: Forty-Three New Stories (Paperback). foreword by Spalding Gray. New York: Seven Stories Press. ISBN 1-58322-026-7.
- Souliotis, Yannis; Constantine, Peter (2000). In Greek Blue: Poems. Athens: Mimnermos, 2000.
- Ismail, Kadare; Constantine, Peter (2000). Elegy for Kosovo. New York: Arcade Publishing. ISBN 1-55970-528-0.
- Ismail, Kadare; Constantine, Peter (2000). Three Elegies for Kosovo. London: Harvill Press. ISBN 1-86046-707-5.
- Heinrich Blücher, Hannah Arendt; Constantine, Peter (2000). Within Four Walls: The Correspondence between Hannah Arendt and Heinrich Blücher, 1936–1968. New York: Harcourt. ISBN 0-15-100303-3.
- Chekhov, Anton; Constantine, Peter (2001). The Undiscovered Chekhov: Fifty-One New Stories. London: Duck Editions. ISBN 0-7156-3106-3.
- Babel, Isaac; Constantine, Peter (2002). The Complete Works of Isaac Babel. edited by Nathalie Babel. Foreword by Cynthia Ozick. New York: W. W. Norton & Company. ISBN 0-393-04846-2.
- Svit, Brina; Constantine, Peter (2002). Con Brio. London: Harvill Press. ISBN 1-86046-857-8.
- Babel, Isaac; Constantine, Peter (2002). The Collected Stories. edited by Nathalie Babel. Foreword by Cynthia Ozick. New York: W. W. Norton & Company. ISBN 0-393-32402-8.
- Babel, Isaac; Constantine, Peter (2003). The Red Cavalry Stories. edited by Nathalie Babel. Foreword by Michael Dirda. New York: W. W. Norton & Company. ISBN 0-393-32423-0.
- Morrisseau-Leroy, Felix; Constantine, Peter (2003). Three Haitian Creole Tales. Los Angeles: Green Integer Press. ISBN 1-931243-22-0.
- Gogol, Nikolai; Constantine, Peter (2003). Taras Bulba. introduction by Robert D. Kaplan. New York: Random House Modern Library. ISBN 0-679-64255-2.
- Tolstoy, Leo; Constantine, Peter (2004). The Cossacks. introduction by Cynthia Ozick. New York: Random House Modern Library. ISBN 0-679-64291-9.
- Voltaire; Constantine, Peter (2005). Candide. New York: Random House Modern Library. ISBN 0-679-64313-3.
- Svit, Brina; Constantine, Peter (2005). Death of a Prima Donna. London: Harvill Press. ISBN 1-84343-045-2.
- Lebert, Benjamin; Constantine, Peter (2006). The Bird is a Raven. New York: Alfred A. Knopf. ISBN 1-4000-4284-4.
- Schlink, Bernhard; Constantine, Peter (2007). Self's Deception. New York: Vintage Books. ISBN 978-0-375-70908-1.
- Machiavelli, Niccolò; Constantine, Peter (2007). The Essential Writings of Machiavelli. New York: Random House Modern Library. ISBN 978-0-679-64313-5.
- Sophocles; Constantine, Peter (2007). Three Theban Plays. New York: Barnes & Noble Classics Collection. ISBN 978-1-59308-235-2.
- Rousseau, Jean-Jacques; Constantine, Peter (2013). The Essential Writings of Rousseau. New York: Random House Modern Library. ISBN 978-0812980387.

== Author ==
- Constantine, Peter (1992). Japanese Street Slang. foreword by James D. McCawley. New York: Tengu Books. ISBN 0-8348-0250-3.
- Constantine, Peter (1993). Japan's Sex Trade: A Journey Through Japan's Erotic Subcultures. Tokyo: Yen Books. ISBN 4-900737-00-3.
- Constantine, Peter (1994). Japanese Slang: Uncensored. Tokyo: Yen Books. ISBN 4-900737-03-8.
- Constantine, Peter (1994). Making Out in Indonesian. Tokyo: Yen Books. ISBN 4-900737-02-X.
- Constantine, Peter (1995). Making Out in Korean. Tokyo: Yen Books. ISBN 4-900737-33-X.
- Constantine, Peter (1998). Making Out in Vietnamese. Hong Kong: Periplus Editions. ISBN 4-900737-48-8.
- Constantine, Peter (1998). A Sucht B. Bern: Scherz Verlag. ISBN 3-502-12130-3.
- Constantine, Peter (2011). Japanese Street Slang (Completely Revised and Updated). foreword by James D. McCawley. New York: Weatherhill. ISBN 978-1-59030-848-6.

== Editor ==
- Editor-in-chief, New Poetry in Translation.
- Edited with Bien, Peter, Edmund Keeley, Karen Van Dyck (2004). A Century of Greek Poetry: 1900–2000. New Jersey: Kosmos Publishing. ISBN 1-932455-00-0.
- Edited with Bradford Morrow, and William Weaver (2002). Conjunctions: 38, Rejoicing Revoicing. New York: Bard College. ISBN 978-0-941964-54-8.
- Edited with Bradford Morrow (2001). Conjunctions: 31, Radical Shadows. New York: Bard College. ISBN 0-941964-47-7.
- The Caribbean Writer, Volume 12, 1998. Special Section: Poems by Celie Diaquoi Deslandes, edited and translated by Peter Constantine from the French.
- The Caribbean Writer, Volume 10, 1996. Special Section: Surinamese short fiction by Paul Bandel, Hélène Ramjiawan, Anne Zeggen en Monique Pool. Edited and translated by Peter Constantine from the Dutch.

== Theatre ==
=== Translations and adaptations ===
- Sarah Bernhardt Comes to Town, by Anton Chekhov. Massachusetts International Festival of the Arts and Moving Theater. Directed by Vanessa Redgrave. World Premiere, 2 May 1998. Performed by Vanessa Redgrave and Rachel Kempson.
- Sarah Bernhardt Comes to Town: An Evening of Chekhov, by Anton Chekhov, adapted by Vanessa Redgrave. 7 August 1999. Directed by Vanessa Redgrave. Performed by Lynn Redgrave, Rachel Kempson and Vanessa Redgrave.
- Maria, by Isaac Babel. Pigott Theater, Stanford. Directed by Carl Weber. Premiere 19 February 2004.
- The Mandrake, by Niccolò Machiavelli. The Pearl Theatre, New York. Directed by Jim Calder. Premiere 8 January 2008.
- The Oedipus Cycle, by Sophocles. The Pearl Theatre, New York. Directed by Shepard Sobel. Premiere 27 October 2008.
