= The Collected Stories of Frank O'Connor =

First edition (publ. Knopf)

Collected Stories is a collection of 67 of Frank O'Connor's best-known short stories, first published in 1981.

The introduction to the collection was written by celebrated literary critic Richard Ellmann.

O'Connor expert Michael A. Steinman has pointed out that this collection is really "more 'selected' than 'collected'" since "it [only] contains one-third of O'Connor's stories".

== Contents ==
The collection contains among others the following stories:

- Christmas Morning
- The Bridal Night
- The Luceys
- Guests of the Nation
- The Late Henry Conran
- The Grand Viziers Daughters
- The Long Road to Ummera
- Song Without Words
