= Christmas Morning =

Short story by Frank O'Connor

Christmas Morning is a short story by Ireland's Frank O'Connor, first published in The New Yorker in its 21 December 1946 print edition. It was included in O'Connor's 1951 collection Traveller's Samples under the alternate title "The Thief". The narrator of the story is Larry Delaney, an Irish boy who appears regularly in O'Connor's stories of this period. Larry Delaney first appears in the concluding story of Guests of the Nation, "The Procession of Life", and is the narrator of the first five stories in Traveller's Samples.

== Plot ==
Larry is a typical mischievous Irish boy who likes to skip school and runs with a rough crowd. Larry fears that, because of his misbehavior, Santa Claus won't be leaving him any presents for Christmas. His fears are stoked by his mother, who scolds him constantly and compares him unfavorably to his smarter, better-behaved younger brother Sonny. Larry resents his mother, who constantly pushes him to excel at school and frets aloud that he will amount to nothing, like his drunken father.

On Christmas morning, Larry wakes up early and finds that Santa Claus has left only a book in his stocking, while there's nothing but a toy gun in Sonny's. Since Larry has no interest in books, he switches the presents, taking the gun for himself and leaving the book to the more studious Sonny. He imagines that no one but Santa Claus will ever know the difference.

To his horror, his mother sees the difference instantly, and weeps that her son is a thief. In that instant, Larry realizes for the first time that there is no Santa Claus, only an impoverished mother who's been striving vainly to raise a decent son under miserable circumstances. By giving Larry a book, his Mother had been trying to steer him to success and a better life. By shunning the book and stealing the toy gun, Larry has broken his mother's heart, and convinced her that he will become a rotter like his father.
