= Betty Chancellor =

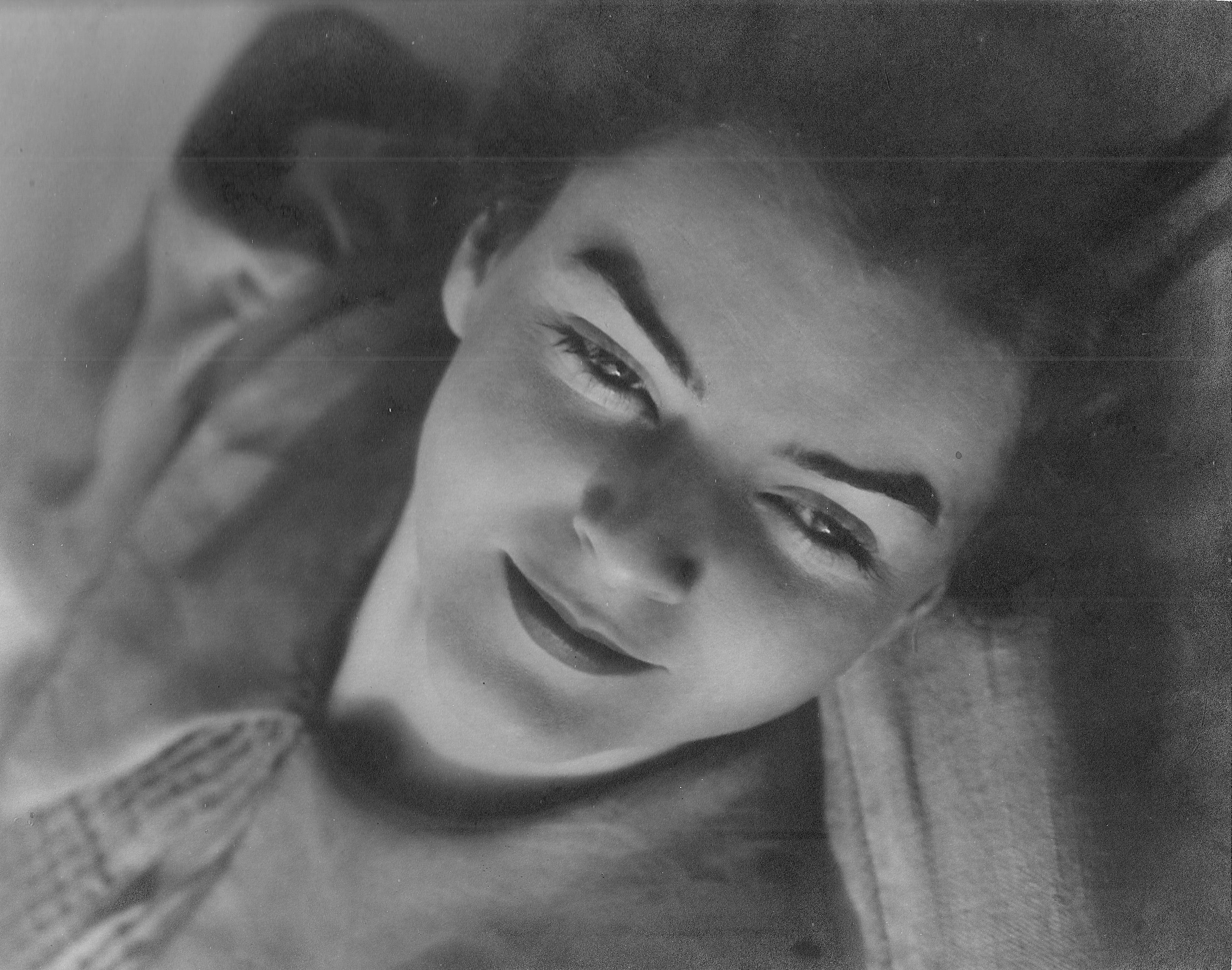
- Born: Lilias Betty Chancellor; 9 January 1910; 8 Fitzwilliam Place, Dublin
- Died: 27 April 1984 (aged 74); Dún Laoghaire, County Dublin
- Burial place: St Patrick's Cathedral, Dublin
- Spouse: Denis Johnston

Betty Chancellor (9 January 1910 – 27 April 1984) was an Irish actress.

== Biography ==
Betty Chancellor was born at 8 Fitzwilliam Place, Dublin on 9 January 1910. Her parents were John William Chancellor, a Dublin clockmaker, jeweller, and photographer, and Cicely Chancellor (née Granger). They married in Billericay, Essex in 1904. She had an elder sister, Joyce Fanny, who also became an actress. She attended Nightingale Hall and Alexandra College, going on to train as a secretary.

=== Career ===
Her first appearance on stage was as a fairy in a benefit performance at the Gaiety Theatre in 1914. She appeared again at the Gaiety in 1922 as Gwennie in F. Anstey's The Man from Blankley's, and then studied drama under Frank Fay. In the 1920s, she acted in the Dublin Drama League's productions in the Abbey Theatre. Once she joined the Gate Theatre her career progressed, establishing her as one of the principal actresses in the Gate by the early 1930s.

Chancellor played Naomi alongside Orson Welles in a production of Jud Süss in October 1931. Welles became infatuated with her and later described her as "the sexiest thing that ever lived." In 1931, she debuted in J. B. Fagan's production of The new gossoon by George Shiels as Biddy Henley at the Apollo Theatre. Her most noted roles were as Toots in Youth's the season in 1932 by Mary Manning; Laura in a production of Carmilla in 1932, based on the novella by Sheridan Le Fanu; Ophelia in 1932; and Cicely in The Importance of Being Earnest in 1933. Touring with the Gate company in 1935, she played Stella in its production of Lord Longford's Yahoo performed in the Westminster Theatre, London. She starred with James Mason in the Gate's production of Pride and Prejudice in 1937. Disappointed with the parts she was getting at the Gate after that and much to the annoyance of Micheál Mac Liammóir and Hilton Edwards, she joined Lord Longford's first provincial tour in 1937.

In the late 1930s, Chancellor worked more often in London. Following her appearance as Baby Furze in the 1938 production of Spring meeting by Molly Keane and John Perry, she was nominated as "Star of the Future" by the Daily Mail. She acted alongside Alec Guinness and Peggy Ashcroft in 1940 in Clemence Dane's Cousin Muriel at the Globe Theatre, directed by John Gielgud.

She returned to the Gaiety Theatre in 1941, to act with Hilton Edwards in a production of Caesar and Cleopatra by George Bernard Shaw, a production that marked the 75th anniversary of the Gaiety. The press welcomed her return to the company, but her fellow actors were disturbed by the fact she was then living with Denis Johnston, the husband of fellow actress Shelah Richards. After Johnston's divorce, they married in March 1945 in Dungannon, County Tyrone. She partly retired from acting to raise their sons, but also due to her increasing deafness that had begun in her teens.

In 1947, she appeared in Johnston's The Moon in the Yellow River at the Arts Theatre in London with Jack Hawkins. The family moved to the United States in November 1948, where she had the lead role in Shaw's Candida at Amherst College, Massachusetts in 1950.

=== Later life and death ===
In 1969, she returned to Ireland with her family and settled in Dalkey, County Dublin. Chancellor died in Dún Laoghaire on 27 April 1984, and is buried at St Patrick's Cathedral, Dublin.
