= Common tone =

Common tone may refer to:

- Common tone (chord)
- Common tone (scale)
- Common tone diminished seventh chord

== See also ==
- Common chord (disambiguation)
