= Bone of Contention =

Bone of Contention may refer to:

- The Bone of Contention, a 2004 audio drama, a spin-off from Doctor Who
- "Bone of Contention", a song by Spirit of the West from the 1993 album Faithlift
- Bones of Contention, a 1936 story by Frank O'Connor
- "Bones of Contention", a 2013 New Yorker article by Paige Williams
- "Bones of Contention", a 1987 book by Roger Lewin
- Bones of Contention, a 1995 BBC documentary about the Native American Graves Protection and Repatriation Act
