= The Cornet Player Who Betrayed Ireland =

Compilation of stories by Frank O'Connor

First edition (publ. Poolbeg Press Ltd)

The Cornet Player Who Betrayed Ireland is a compilation of previously uncollected stories by Frank O'Connor from 1981. The stories were selected by O'Connor's widow, Harriet O'Donovan Sheehy, and the Cork writer David Marcus. The collection includes:

- War
- There is a Lone House
- The Miracle (no relation to "The Miracle" from The Common Chord)
- May Night
- The Flowering Trees
- The Storyteller
- Mac's Masterpiece
- The Climber
- Hughie
- Last Post
- The Cornet Player Who Betrayed Ireland
- Uncle Pat
- The Adventuress
- The Landlady
- Baptismal
- What Girls Are For
- Adventure
- A Case of Conscience
- The Call
- Ghosts
- The Grip of the Geraghtys
