= Collection Two =

Collection Two or Collection 2 may refer to:

- Collection Two, also published as More Stories by Frank O'Connor
- Collection Two: 1965–66 Doctor Who missing episodes
