= A Frank O'Connor Reader =

- Short story by Frank O'Connor
- Country: Ireland
- Genre: Short story

Publication
- Publisher: Syracuse University Press
- Publication date: 1994

A Frank O'Connor Reader is a compilation of works by the Irish writer Frank O'Connor selected and edited by Michael A. Steinman, and it includes short stories, autobiographical pieces, translations of Irish-language poetry, and essays on topics from politics to literary criticism.

Among the seventeen short stories are one that had never been published anywhere before ("The Rebel") and one that had never been published in book form before ("Darcy in Tír na nÓg"). "Darcy in Tír na nÓg" was originally written by O'Connor in Irish and translated by Richard B. Walsh. It bears no relation to O'Connor's English-language story "Darcy in the Land of Youth" from Traveller's Samples.
