= The Lonely Voice =

The Lonely Voice (1962) is a study of the short story form, written by Frank O'Connor.

== Description ==
Within the study, O'Connor expounds on some of his own major theories of the short story as well as discusses the work of many influential short story writers. Each chapter focuses on a different author:

1. Ivan Turgenev
2. Guy de Maupassant
3. Anton Chekhov
4. Rudyard Kipling
5. James Joyce
6. Katherine Mansfield
7. D. H. Lawrence
8. Ernest Hemingway
9. A. E. Coppard
10. Isaac Babel
11. Mary Lavin

== Reception ==
One of the work's major contributions is that of "the submerged population group" - a term that O'Connor uses to characterise those individuals who, for whatever reasons, are left on the fringes of society. The term was taken up again in the twenty-first century by Amit Chaudhuri to usefully characterise modernist writing in the Indian subcontinent.

The book is seen by many critics as the first lengthy examination of the short story form, and it has been heralded by many writers as an influential work.
