= Guests of the Nation (short story collection) =

1931 short story collection by Frank O'Connor

- Author: Frank O'Connor
- Language: English
- Publisher: The Macmillan Company
- Publication date: September 1931
- Publication place: Ireland
- Media type: Print (hardcover)
- Pages: 278 pp. (first edition)
- OCLC: 1935109

Guests of the Nation is a 1931 short story collection by Frank O'Connor. It includes 15 stories:

- "Guests of the Nation"
- "Attack"
- "Jumbo's Wife"
- "Nightpiece with Figures"
- "September Dawn"
- "Machine-gun Corps in Action"
- "Laughter"
- "Jo"
- "Alec"
- "Soiree Chez une Belle Jeune Fille"
- "The Patriarch"
- "After Fourteen Years"
- "The Late Henry Conran"
- "The Sisters"
- "The Procession of Life"

== Publication history ==
In September 1931, Guests of the Nation was published in London and in New York City by the Macmillan Company. The title story first appeared in the January 1931 issue of The Atlantic Monthly.

- 1931, London: Macmillan and Co., Limited, September 1931, hardcover
- 1931, New York: The Macmillan Company, September 1931, hardcover
- 1979, Dublin, Ireland: Poolbeg Press, Ltd.,1979, softcover; 1985 edition (ISBN 0 905169 89 1) reprinted 1987, 1993
