= Common chord =

Common chord may refer to:

- Common chord (geometry), the secant line that joins the intersection points of two curves
- Common chord (music), a chord shared by two musical keys
- The Common Chord, a 1947 short story collection by Frank O'Connor
- Common Chord (album), a 1993 album by David Grisman
- Common Chord (organization), nonprofit community music organization in Davenport, Iowa
