= More Stories by Frank O'Connor =

1954 short story collection

First US edition

More Stories by Frank O'Connor is a 1954 short story collection featuring both old and new stories by the Irish writer Frank O'Connor. A similar collection was published in the U.K. in 1964 as Collection Two.

== Contents ==
The new stories appearing here in book form for the first time were:

- Eternal Triangle
- The Face of Evil
- Masculine Protest
- The Sorcerer's Apprentice
- A Romantic (no relation to "A Romantic" from Bones of Contention)
- The Little Mother
- A Sense of Responsibility
- Counsel For Oedipus (alternate title: A Brief For Oedipus)
- A Torrent Damned
- The Old Faith
- Vanity
- Father and Son
- Unapproved Route
- Lonely Rock
