= Evelyn Bowen =

Welsh-Canadian actress (1911–1994)

- Born: Esther Evelyn Sara Owen Bowen; 18 June 1911; Cardigan, Wales
- Died: 4 November 1994 (aged 83); Wolfville, Nova Scotia, Canada
- Other names: Evelyn Speaight; Evelyn OʹDonovan; Evelyn Garbary
- Spouse(s): Robert Speaight (m. 1935; div. 1939) Frank O'Connor (m. 1939; div. 1953) Abraham Garbary (m. 1954)
- Children: 6

Evelyn Bowen (18 June 1911 – 4 November 1994) was a Welsh–Canadian actress, director, writer, editor and educator.

== Biography ==
Esther Evelyn Sara Owen Bowen was born on 18 June 1911 in Cardigan, Wales to Evan Owen Bowen, a doctor and Elizabeth Evans. Her father died when she was three and her mother remarried Owen Davies. Her mother's father was mayor of Cardigan. The Evans family spoke Welsh at home. The Bowens spoke English. Davies moved the family to Carnarvon in North Wales.

Bowen was educated in St. Winifred’s School for Girls in Llanfairfechan before going to the London Academy of Music and Dramatic Art until 1929.

When in London, Bowen began her acting career at Old Vic Shakespearean Company. As an actor entering the profession, many of her early roles were as "extra", a second for roles of more senior members of the company; with experience she began to take on roles herself. After her time with the Old Vic, she worked with the MacDona Players which produced travelling productions performed in smaller cities throughout Britain.

In 1932 she was a member of John Martin Harvey's company doing its last tour of Canada. On that tour, she was taken to a performance by a traditional Chinese theatre company in Vancouver where she was struck by the precision, delicacy and artistry of a production that used masks, mime and dance, was ritualistic, traditional and popular.

She returned to Wales where she became a founder of the Welsh National Theatre Company and was its director from 1933 to 1936.

She met Irish writer, dramatist and director of the Abbey Theatre Frank O'Connor in 1936. He persuaded Seán Ó Faoláin that Bowen should play the lead role in the upcoming Abbey production of his play, She had to Do Something. After controversy among Abbey actors and management, she was granted the role; the play was produced in 1937. Bowen moved to Dublin to take on the part. She married O'Connor in 1939; the couple divorced in 1953.

In 1956, Bowen migrated to Canada.

For 1967, Canada's centenary year, she commissioned playwright David Giffin to write Coming Here to Stay on the arrival of Black United Empire Loyalists to Nova Scotia. She then produced the play with the community group The Inglewood Players, and presented it at the Dominion Drama Festival, the annual national community drama festival of the time. In the same year she was appointed Director of Drama at Acadia University.

With puppeteer Tom Miller, she co-founded the Acadia Child Drama and Puppet Theatre with students from Acadia University in 1971. With the involvement of Sarah Lee Lewis as an administrator, by 1973, the collaboration formed Mermaid Theatre for Young Audiences.

Bowen was a writer as well as an actress. She wrote plays with Ernest Buckler, wrote for radio, coached and edited Nova Scotia writers—stories by author Tessie Gillis were brought to publication as The Promised Land: Stories Of Cape Breton, (1992). She wrote plays for production by Mermaid Theatre, a number based on Mi’kmaq legends.

In 1976 Bowen studied at the Leningrad Theater School. In 1979 she was awarded the honorary degree of Doctor of Letters by Acadia University. In the 1980s she wrote her memoirs, Letters to my Grandchildren, as radio talks. Bowen stayed involved in theatre and writing until she died in 1994.

== Personal life ==
Bowen lived in Wales until 1928 when she moved to London where she lived from 1928 to 1932. When she was twenty-three she made her debut at court.

She married Robert Speaight in 1935; they were divorced in 1939. The couple had one son.

Bowen married Irish poet and writer Frank O’Connor (Michael O'Donovan) in February 1939 The couple had three children; they divorced in 1953.

Following the divorce from O'Connor, Bowen married Abraham Garbary, an engineer. The Garbarys had two children. In 1956 the couple moved to Canada, first to Toronto, then Montreal; the children followed in 1957. The family finally settled in Nova Scotia. There, as Evelyn Garbary, she established herself as a theatrical director and producer, writer and editor, dramatist and educator.

Evelyn Bowen died in Wolfville, Nova Scotia on 4 November 1994.
