= St Patrick's School, Cork =

School complex in Ireland

Saint Patrick's School is a campus of schools (St Patrick's infants school, St Patrick's Girls Primary, St Patrick's Boys Primary and Saint Patrick's College) in Cork, Ireland. Saint Patrick's is situated on Gardiner's Hill and has a history dating to the 1820s.

== History ==
The school began operations in October 1822 as Brickfields Male and Female Free School in rented premises in two private homes in Lower Glanmire Road, Cork. Students were not charged tuition, and funding for the school was provided by charitable donations and an annual fundraiser. The school became part of Ireland's National education system in 1833. At that point the school had two teachers and 100 students (60 boys and 40 girls).

=== Saint Luke’s Cross ===
In 1840, Brickfields Free School held its last lessons and in September 1841, its pupils and staff moved to a new purpose-built premises at Saint Luke's Cross. The new school, which had space for many more students was called St. Patrick's School and in a fundraising letter written at the time of opening the school manager, Rev. Patrick William Coffey, described the new building as having two floors, with the boys using the upper floor and entering the building from the Ballyhooly Road (just above where the pedestrian crossing is now) and the girls using the lower floor and entering from Alexandra Road. Coffey described the interior as having been kitted out with desks, blackboards, lockers, and two fireplaces.

At the time of its opening Saint Patrick's School had 300 pupils on the books, 174 boys and 126 girls. Most of the pupils paid 1d a month for their schooling but around 100 pupils paid no tuition. The founding school manager, Fr. Coffey died of typhus in June 1847 at the age of 42. A plaque was erected in his memory in the church.

In 1863, St. Patrick's Infants' School was opened in a newly built schoolroom, using a donation from the estate of J. Murphy of Clifton, Montenotte. The school had 85 students (34 boys and 51 girls), most of whom had transferred from the existing Boys' and Girls' Schools. By 1873 the Infants' School had 300 students.

In 1886, an evening school for adults was opened in St. Patrick's Male School. It operated from 19:00 to 21:00, Monday to Thursday. When the District Inspector from the Board of Education visited the night school, he found thirty students being taught (all male) and a further 47 on the books, he recommended that the school be funded.

At the time of the First World War the writer Daniel Corkery was a teacher in Saint Patricks. He introduced Gaelic Games to the school in 1917. His pupils at the school included the sculptor Séamus Murphy and writer Frank O’Connor. Corkery resigned from Saint Patrick's in 1921 after being passed over for a promotion to Headmaster. He would go on to have successful careers in academia and politics.

=== Gardiner's Hill ===
Saint Patrick's School remained at Saint Luke's for almost a hundred years. By the late 1930s however the site had become inadequate and it was decided to move to a new purpose-built school that would be built in the fields between the Ballyhooly Road and Gardiners Hill.

On 29 November 1937 the 261 boys walked the few hundred yards to the new site on Gardiner's Hill. The new school was officially opened by the Lord Mayor Jim Hickey.

The girls remained at St Lukes until 1955 when they moved to their a new purpose-built school (designed by James Barrett) in the site adjoining the boys school. The new building also housed St. Patrick's Infants' School and allowed for a post-primary level school for girls, St Patrick's College, to be founded in 1958.

In 1995, a new purpose-built school was built on the campus for St Patrick's College. St. Patrick's Infants' School and St. Patrick's Girls National School remained in the 1955 building.

In 2007, an all-Polish weekend school was launched at Saint Patrick's, based in the Boys National School (1937) building.

== Notable pupils and staff ==
- Daniel Corkery, Writer, Academic and Politician
- Frank O'Connor, Writer
- Séamus Murphy, Sculptor
- Alan Lotty, Hurler
- Jackie O'Driscoll, Footballer
- Joe Kelly, Hurler
- Donie O'Donovan, Gaelic Footballer
- Seán O'Brien, Hurler
- Michael Davitt, Poet
- Johnny Buckley, Hurler
- Donal Lenihan, Rugby player
- David Corkery, Rugby player
- Leon McSweeney, Footballer
- Tomás O'Leary, Rugby player
