= Robert Speaight =

British actor and writer (1904–1976)

- Born: 14 January 1904; St Margaret's at Cliffe, England
- Died: 4 November 1976 (aged 72) near Benenden, England
- Spouse: Evelyn Bowen (sep. 1939)
- Relatives: George Speaight (brother)

Robert William Speaight CBE (/speɪt/ SPAYT; 14 January 1904 – 4 November 1976) was a British actor and writer, and the brother of George Speaight, the puppeteer. Speaight studied under Elsie Fogerty at the Central School of Speech and Drama, then based in the Royal Albert Hall, London.

Speaight was an early performer (from 1927) in radio plays. He came to prominence as Becket in the first production of T. S. Eliot's Murder in the Cathedral. He went on to Shakespearean roles and to direct. He played the title role in the first broadcast in 1941–42 of the radio drama The Man Born to Be King.

He also wrote criticism and essays, works on the theatre and biography. He was a Catholic convert, and biographer of Hilaire Belloc and Eric Gill. In the case of Gill, a personal friend, he suppressed material about Gill's sexual interests, which only came out in the 1989 biography by Fiona MacCarthy.

He married the Welsh actress Evelyn Bowen, with whom he had a son; they separated in 1939. Evelyn later married the celebrated Irish writer Frank O'Connor, with whom she had three children.

== Works ==
- Mutinous Wind (1932)
- The Lost Hero (1934) novel
- Nurse Cavell (1934) play, role of the German spy in C.S. Forester's play about the life of Edith Cavell
- Legend of Helena Vaughan (1936) novel
- The Angel in the Mist (1936)
- St. Thomas of Canterbury (1938)
- Acting: its idea and tradition (1939)
- The Unbroken Heart (1939)
- Since 1939 - Drama, the Novel, Poetry, Prose Literature (1949) with John Hayward, Henry Reed, Stephen Spender – earlier as pamphlet Drama Since 1939 (1947)
- George Eliot (1954) "The English Novelists series"
- William Poel and the Elizabethan Revival (1954)
- Nature in Shakespearian Tragedy (1955)
- Life of Hilaire Belloc (1957)
- Letters from Hilaire Belloc (1958) editor
- Christian Theatre (1960) volume 124 in the 20th Century Encyclopedia of Catholicism
- William Rothenstein: The Portrait of an Artist in His Time (1962)
- Ronald Knox: The Priest, The Writer (1965) with Thomas Corbishley
- The Life of Eric Gill (1966)
- Teilhard de Chardin: A Biography (1967)
- Teilhard de Chardin: Re-Mythologization. Three Papers (1970) with Robert V. Wilshire and J. V. Langmead Casserley
- Vanier: Soldier, Diplomat and Governor General; A Biography (1970) on Georges Vanier
- The Property Basket. Recollections of a Divided Life (1970) autobiography
- A Bridges-Adams Letter Book (1971) editor
- Essays by Divers Hands Vol. XXXVII (1972) editor
- Shakespeare on the Stage; an Illustrated History of Shakespearian Performance (1973)
- Georges Bernanos: A Study of the Man and the Writer (1974)
- The Companion Guide to Burgundy (1975)
- François Mauriac: A Study of the Writer and the Man (1976)
- Shakespeare - the Man and his Achievement (1977)

== Recordings ==
- The Love Song of J. Alfred Prufrock (T. S. Eliot)
- The Hollow Men (T. S. Eliot)
- The Waste Land (T. S. Eliot)
- Ash Wednesday (T. S. Eliot)
- Thomas a-Becket's Sermon from Murder in the Cathedral (T. S. Eliot)
- Four Quartets (T. S. Eliot)

== Filmography ==
- London 1942 (1943) - narrator
