= A Set of Variations =

1969 short story collection by Frank O'Connor

First edition (US)

A Set of Variations is a 1969 short story collection by Frank O'Connor. It was compiled shortly after the author's death by his widow, Harriet O'Donovan Sheehy, and includes the following stories:

- A Set of Variations on a Borrowed Theme (alternate title: Variations on a Theme)
- The American Wife
- The Impossible Marriage
- The Cheat
- The Weeping Children
- The Saint
- A Minority
- An Out-And-Out Free Gift
- Anchors
- Sue
- Music When Soft Voices Die
- A Life of Your Own
- The Corkerys
- A Story By Maupassant
- A Great Man
- The School For Wives
- Androcles and the Army
- Public Opinion
- The Party
- Achilles' Heel
- Lost Fatherlands
- The Wreath
- The Teacher's Mass
- The Martyr
- Requiem
- An Act of Charity
- The Mass Island

A similar collection was published in the U.K. in 1969 as Collection Three. The stories included were slightly different, and Collection Three featured one story not included in A Set of Variations ("A Mother's Warning").
