= Frank O'Connor =

Irish writer (1903–1966)

- Born: Michael Francis O'Donovan; 17 September 1903; Cork, Ireland
- Died: 10 March 1966 (aged 62); Dublin, Ireland
- Occupations: writer, professor
- Spouses: Evelyn Bowen (m. 1939; div. 1953) Harriet Rich (m. 1953)
- Military Service
- Branch: Irish Republican Army; Anti-Treaty IRA
- Conflicts: Irish War of Independence; Irish Civil War

Frank O'Connor (born Michael Francis O'Donovan; 17 September 1903 – 10 March 1966) was an Irish author and translator. He wrote poetry (original and translations from Irish), dramatic works, memoirs, journalistic columns and features on aspects of Irish culture and history, criticism, long and short fiction (novels and short stories), biography, and travel books. He is most widely known for his more than 150 short stories and for his memoirs. The Frank O'Connor International Short Story Award was named in his honour, as is the Frank O'Connor International Short Story Fellowship.

== Early life ==
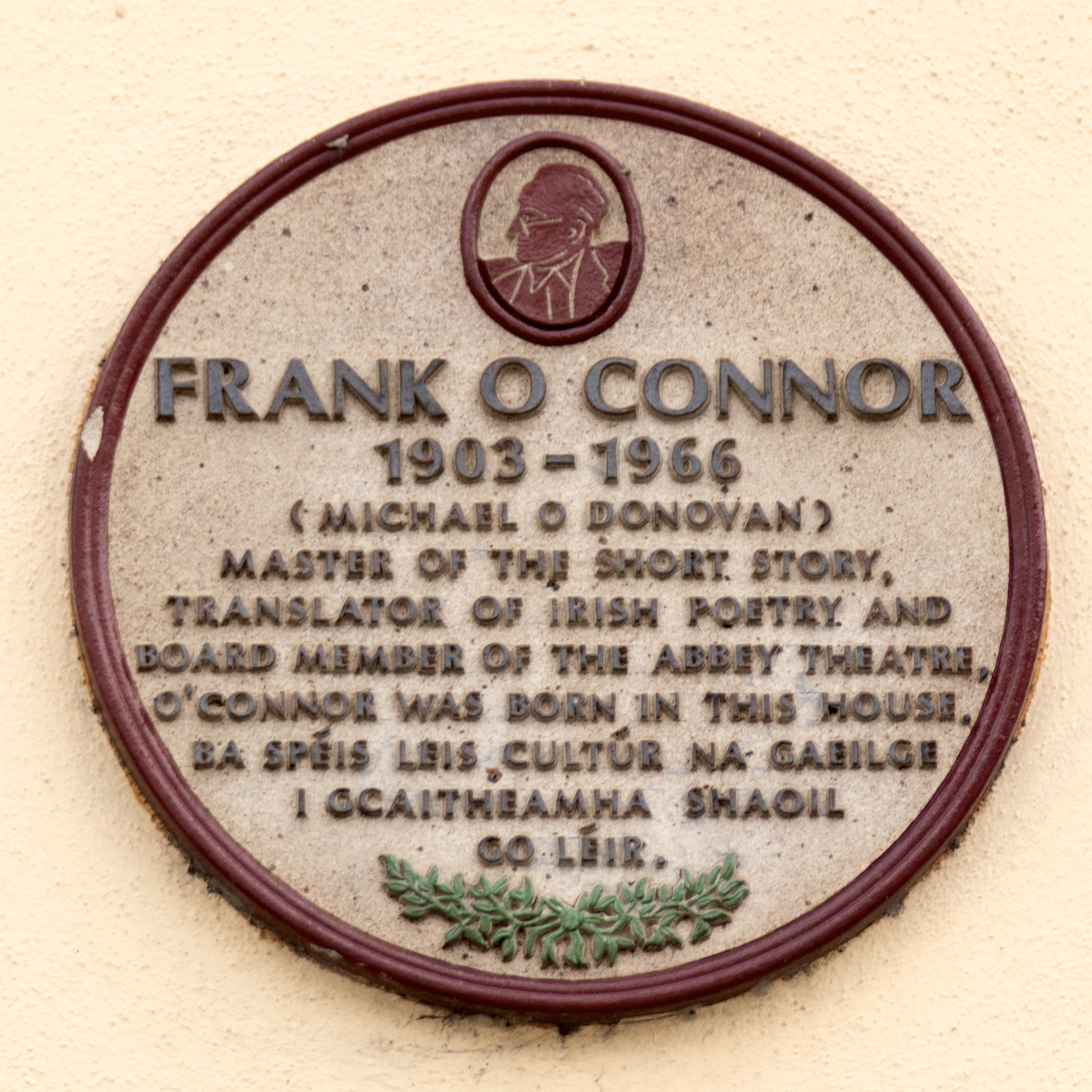

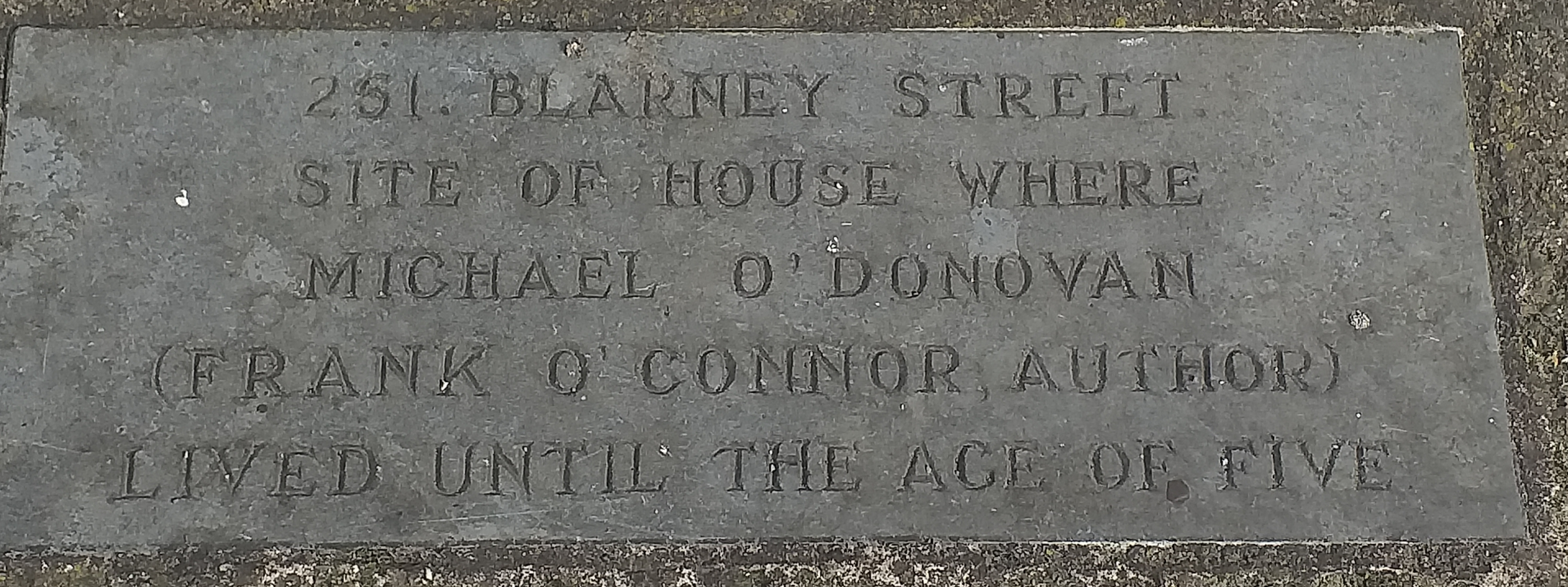
Plaques marking O'Connor's birthplace and his childhood home in Cork

Raised in Cork, he was the only child of Minnie (née O'Connor) and Michael O'Donovan. He attended Saint Patrick's School on Gardiner's Hill. One teacher, Daniel Corkery, introduced O'Connor's class to the Irish language and poetry and deeply influenced the young pupil. He later attended North Monastery Christian Brothers School.

O'Connor's early life was marked by his father's alcoholism, debt, and ill-treatment of his mother. His childhood was strongly shaped by his mother, who supplied much of the family's income by cleaning houses, and his father was unable to keep steady employment due to alcoholism. O'Connor adored his mother and was bitterly resentful of his father. In his memoirs, he recalled his childhood as "those terrible years", and admitted that he had never been able to forgive his father for his abuse of himself and his mother. When his mother was 70, O'Connor was horrified to learn from his own doctor that she had suffered for years from chronic appendicitis, which she had endured with great stoicism, as she had never had the time nor the money to see a doctor.

== Irish nationalism ==
In 1918 O'Connor joined the First Brigade of the Irish Republican Army and served in combat during the Irish War of Independence. He opposed the Anglo-Irish Treaty of 1921 and joined the Anti-Treaty IRA during the Irish Civil War, working in a small propaganda unit in Cork City. He was one of 12,000 Anti-Treaty combatants who were interned by the government of the new Irish Free State. In February 1923, O'Connor was imprisoned in Cork City Gaol and in April moved to Gormanston, County Meath where he was held until just before Christmas. War is a major theme in most stories of O'Connor's first published collection, Guests of the Nation, 1931.

== Literary career ==
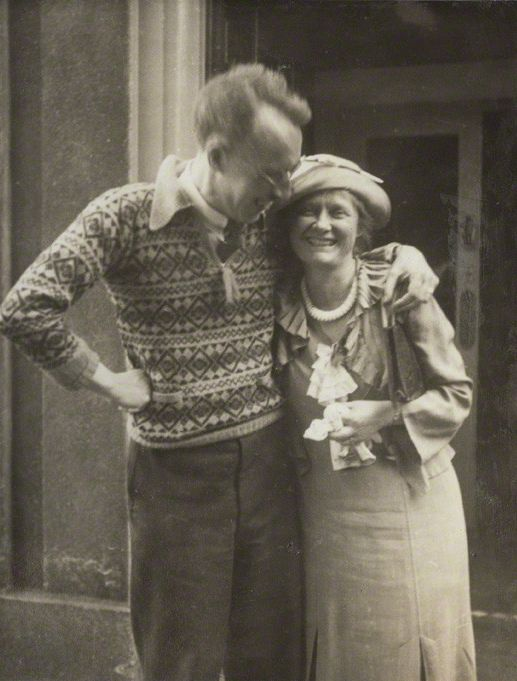
O'Connor in 1936, with writer Signe Toksvig

Following his release from Gormanston, O'Connor took various positions including that of teacher of Irish and theatre director. Thanks to his continuing connection with Corkery, he was introduced to Lennox Robinson, then the secretary for the Carnegie Trust. Robinson was organizing rural libraries and engaged O'Connor as a trainee. O'Connor worked first in Sligo and later under Geoffrey Phibbs in Wicklow.

Through Phibbs, he met and was befriended by George William Russell (Æ), who requested O'Connor to send him material for publication. Russell introduced O'Connor to most of the well-known Irish writers of the day, including W. B. Yeats, F. R. Higgins and Augusta Gregory. In his memoirs, O'Connor paid tribute to both Yeats and Russell for their help and encouragement.

In December 1928, he moved to Dublin to take up the position of librarian at the Pembroke District Library.

In 1935, O'Connor became a member of the board of directors of the Abbey Theatre in Dublin, founded by Yeats and other members of the Irish National Theatre Society. In 1937, he became managing director of the Abbey. Following Yeats's death in 1939, O'Connor's long-standing conflict with other board members came to a head and he left the Abbey later that year.

In 1950, he accepted invitations to teach in the United States, where many of his short stories had been published in The New Yorker and won great acclaim. He spent much of the 1950s in the United States, although it was always his intention to return eventually to Ireland.

== Death ==
O'Connor had a stroke while teaching at Stanford University in 1961, and he later died from a heart attack in Dublin, Ireland on 10 March 1966. He was buried in Deans Grange Cemetery on 12 March 1966.

== Family ==
In 1939 O'Connor married Evelyn Bowen (who had previously been married to the actor Robert Speaight): they had two sons and a daughter. They were divorced in 1953. O'Connor married, secondly, Harriet Rich of Baltimore, whom he met while lecturing at Northwestern University. They had one daughter. Between his marriages to Bowen and Rich, he was romantically involved with Joan Knape, with whom he had a son, Oliver O'Donovan.

== Work ==
O'Connor was perhaps best known for his varied and comprehensive short stories but also for his work as a literary critic, essayist, travel writer, translator and biographer. He was also a novelist, poet and dramatist.

O'Connor's career began in 1922 and accelerated with the appearance of poetry in translation, articles on early Irish poets, book reviews by stories and original poetry. Much of this material appeared in Æ's journal Irish Statesman.

From the early 1930s following the publication of his first volume of short stories, Guests of the Nation (1931), to his death in 1966 he was a prolific writer of short stories (c. 160), translations of a wide range of Irish poetry (c. 120), plays, both alone and in collaborations (c.10), novels (2) as well as works in non-fiction covering topics in literary criticism and theory, travel, Irish culture, and biography. His work as an Irish teacher complemented his plethora of translations into English of Irish poetry, including his initially banned translation of Brian Merriman's Cúirt an Mheán Oíche (The Midnight Court). Many of O'Connor's writings were based on his own life experiences – notably his well-known The Man of the House in which he reveals childhood details concerning his early life in County Cork. The Sullivan family in this short story, like his own boyhood family, is lacking a proper father figure.

In other stories, his character Larry Delaney, in particular, is reminiscent of events in O'Connor's own life. O'Connor's experiences in the Irish War of Independence and the Irish Civil War are reflected in The Big Fellow, his biography of Irish revolutionary leader Michael Collins, published in 1937, and one of his best-known short stories, Guests of the Nation (1931), published in various forms during O'Connor's lifetime and included in Frank O'Connor – Collected Stories, published in 1981.

O'Connor's early years are recounted in An Only Child (1961), a memoir which has the immediacy of a precocious diary. U.S. President John F. Kennedy remarked anecdotally from An Only Child at the conclusion of his speech at the dedication of the Aerospace Medical Health Center in San Antonio on 21 November 1963: "Frank O'Connor, the Irish writer, tells in one of his books how, as a boy, he and his friends would make their way across the countryside, and when they came to an orchard wall that seemed too high and too doubtful to try and too difficult to permit their voyage to continue, they took off their hats and tossed them over the wall—and then they had no choice but to follow them. This nation has tossed its cap over the wall of space and we have no choice but to follow it."

O'Connor continued his autobiography through his time with the Abbey Theatre in Dublin, which ended in 1939, in his book, My Father's Son, which was published in 1968, posthumously. It contains valuable character sketches of many of the leading Irish literary figures of the 1930s, in particular, Yeats and Russell.

== Frank O'Connor Festival and Prize ==
Since 2000, The Munster Literature Centre in O'Connor's hometown of Cork has run a festival dedicated to the short story form in O'Connor's name. The longest-established annual festival dedicated to the short story form in an English-speaking country, it regularly hosts readings, workshops and masterclasses for contemporary practitioners of the form, as well as celebrating the work of O'Connor and other local short fiction writers such as Elizabeth Bowen, Seán Ó Faoláin and William Trevor.

The festival has hosted readings by: Richard Ford, Julia O'Faolain, James Lasdun, Alasdair Gray, Dan Rhodes, Eugene McCabe, Bernard MacLaverty, Desmond Hogan, James Plunkett, Lyudmila Ulitskaya, Rebecca Miller, Anne Enright, Mike McCormack, Etgar Keret, Éilís Ní Dhuibhne, Cónal Creedon, Samrat Upadhyay, Philip Ó Ceallaigh, Rachel Sherman, David Marcus, Panos Karnezis, Nisha da Cunha, William Wall, Bret Anthony Johnston, David Means, Claire Keegan, Miranda July, Rick Moody, Jhumpa Lahiri, Yiyun Li, Julie Orringer, ZZ Packer, Simon Van Booy, Wells Tower, Charlotte Grimshaw and Kevin Barry among others. It also has a tradition of encouraging younger writers at the start of their career, Jon Boilard for example.

The Frank O'Connor International Short Story Award, is awarded to the best short fiction collection published in English anywhere in the world in the year preceding the festival. The prize is also open to translated works and in the event of a translation winning the prize is divided equally between author and translator. The award is described as "the richest prize for the short story form" and at €35,000 in 2010 is one of the most valuable literary prizes for any category of literature.

== In popular culture ==
O'Connor's short story "Guests of the Nation" has been the basis of several films. The story is set during the Irish War of Independence and chronicles the doomed friendship between the members of an I.R.A. unit and the two British Army hostages whom they are guarding. The first film was a silent one, directed in 1934 by Denis Johnston and featuring Barry Fitzgerald and Cyril Cusack. Neil Jordan's award-winning film The Crying Game was inspired in part by this story.

== Bibliography ==
=== Short story collections ===
- Guests of the Nation (1931), including the famous title story
- Bones of Contention (1936), including the story "The Majesty of Law", a short story adapted as an episode of the 1957 film The Rising of the Moon.
- Crab Apple Jelly (1944)
- The Common Chord (1947)
- Traveller's Samples (1951), including the classic story "First Confession"
- The Stories of Frank O'Connor (1952), including the first publication of perhaps his most popular story "My Oedipus Complex"
- More Stories by Frank O'Connor (1954)
- Domestic Relations (1957)
- A Set of Variations (1969)
- The Cornet Player Who Betrayed Ireland (1981)
- The Collected Stories (1981), edited by Richard Ellmann
- The Collar: Stories of Irish Priests (1993)
- A Frank O'Connor Reader (1994)

=== Novels ===
- The Saint and Mary Kate (1932)
- Dutch Interior (1940)

=== Autobiography ===
- O'Connor, Frank (1961). An Only Child. London: Macmillan.
- — (1968). My Father's Son. London: Macmillan.

=== Poetry ===
- Three Old Brothers and Other Poems (1936)

=== Plays ===
- Moses' Rock (1938)

=== Poetry from the Irish ===
- The Wild Bird's Nest (1932)
- Lords and Commons, Translations from the Irish (1938)
- Lament for Art O'Leary (1940)
- The Midnight Court (1945)
- Kings, Lords, and Commons (1959)
- The Little Monasteries (1963)

=== Irish history ===
- The Big Fellow, biography of Michael Collins (1937)

=== Travel writing ===
- Irish Miles (1947)
- Leinster, Munster and Connaught (1950)

=== Criticism ===
- The Road to Stratford (1948; revised edition published in 1960–61 in the US as Shakespeare's Progress)
- The Mirror in the Roadway: A Study of the Modern Novel (1956)
- The Lonely Voice: A Study of the Short Story (1962)
- The Backward Look: A Survey of Irish Literature (1967; published in the US as A Short History of Irish Literature: A Backward Look)

== See also ==
- Frank O'Connor International Short Story Award
- List of people on the postage stamps of Ireland
