= Séamus Murphy (sculptor) =

Irish sculptor and stone carver

- Born: James Murphy; 15 July 1907; Mallow, County Cork, Ireland
- Died: 2 October 1975 (aged 68); Cork
- Occupation: sculptor

Séamus Murphy (15 July 1907 – 2 October 1975) was an Irish sculptor and stone carver, best known for designing the Church of the Annunciation, Blackpool, Cork. Examples of his unique carvings of statues, gravestones, monuments and plaques can be found around Ireland, particularly County Cork.

== Life ==
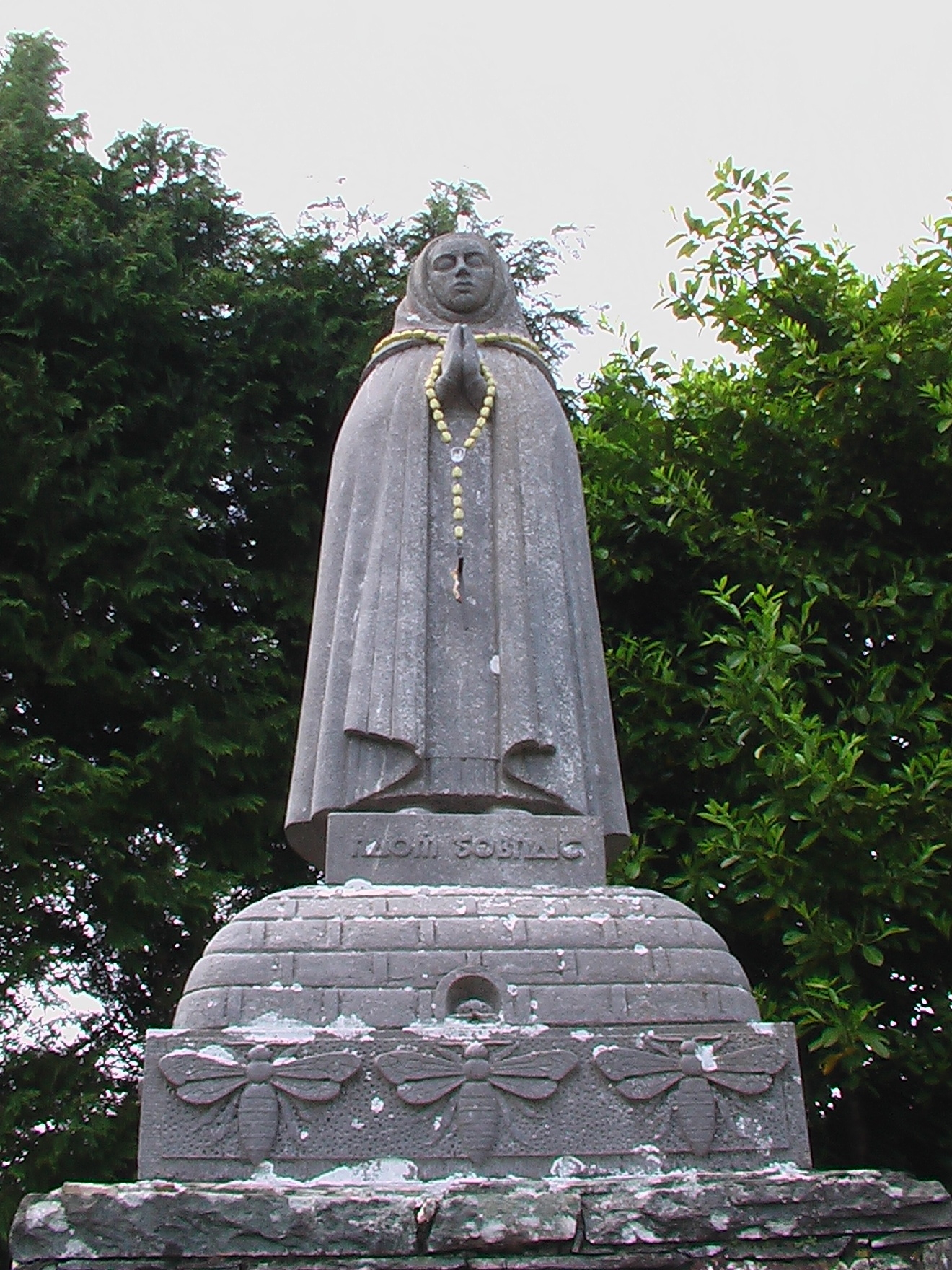
Saint Gobnait at Ballyvourney

The birth of James (Séamus) Murphy, and that of his twin brother John, is recorded at Fair Street, Mallow, County Cork, on 15 July 1907. His father, James Murphy, was a railway engine driver. The family later moved to Cork.

He attended Saint Patrick's School on Gardiner's Hill where his teacher was Daniel Corkery who encouraged him to go to art school. He attended the Crawford School of Art (1921-22) and then took up an apprenticeship with a monumental sculptors' firm. He would, in time, go on to become a Royal Hibernian Academy professor of sculpture.

In 1944 he married Maighread Higgins, daughter of the Cork sculptor Joseph Higgins. They went on to have three children; the knitwear designer Bebhinn Marten, the novelist Orla Murphy and the painter and De Dannan member Colm Murphy. His studio/workshop was at Watercourse Road, Blackpool, Cork.

In the 1945 local elections, he ran unsuccessfully for the minor fascist party Ailtirí na hAiséirghe in Cork Corporation, taking 116 (0.42%) of first preference votes.

While Murphy produced many religious works, his relationship with the leadership of the Catholic Church in Ireland was not always amicable. Having produced a bust of Archbishop John Charles McQuaid which the archbishop disapproved of, he was blacklisted for some time by the church in Cork.

== Works ==
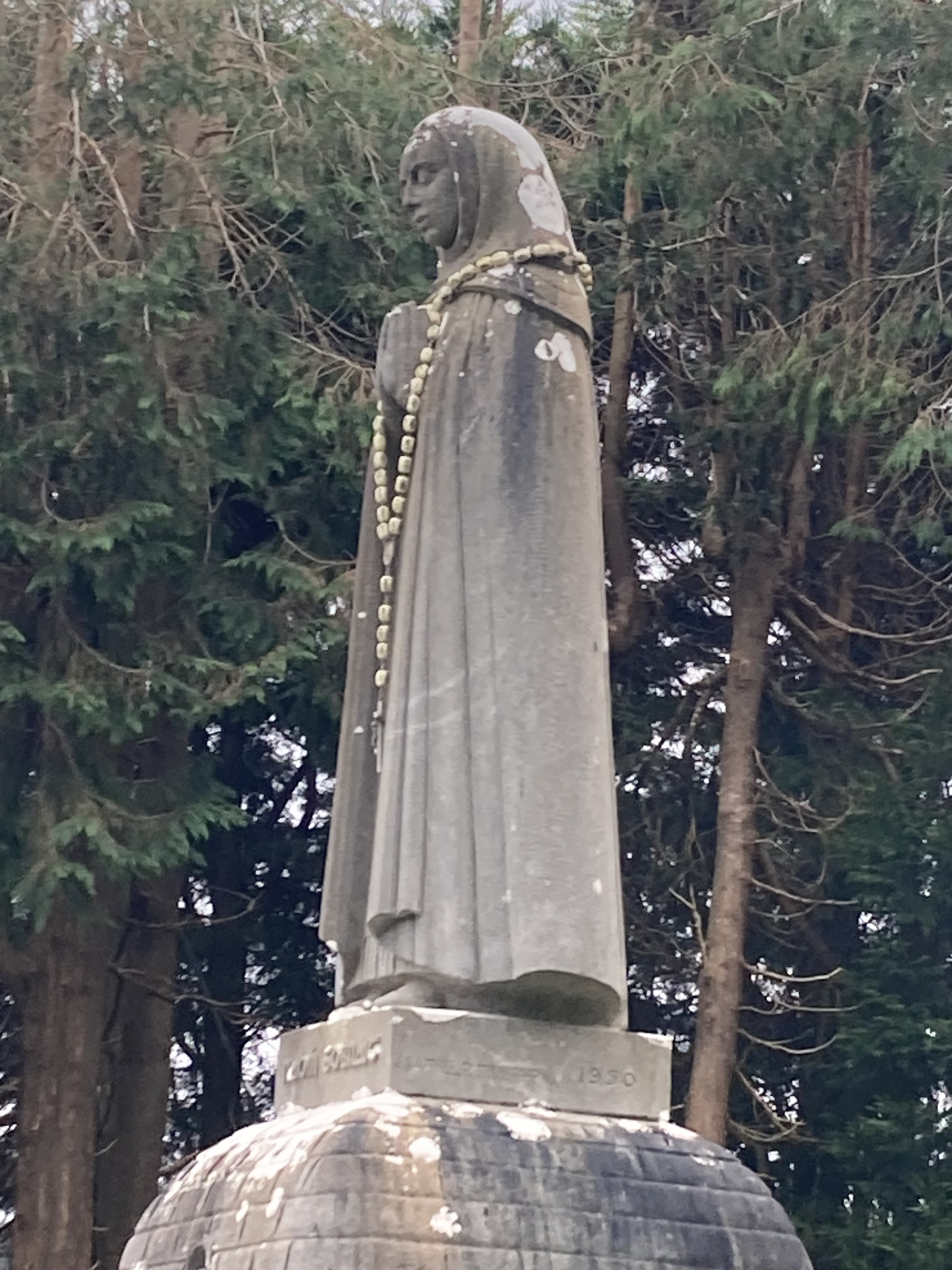
St Gobnait, Ballyvourney

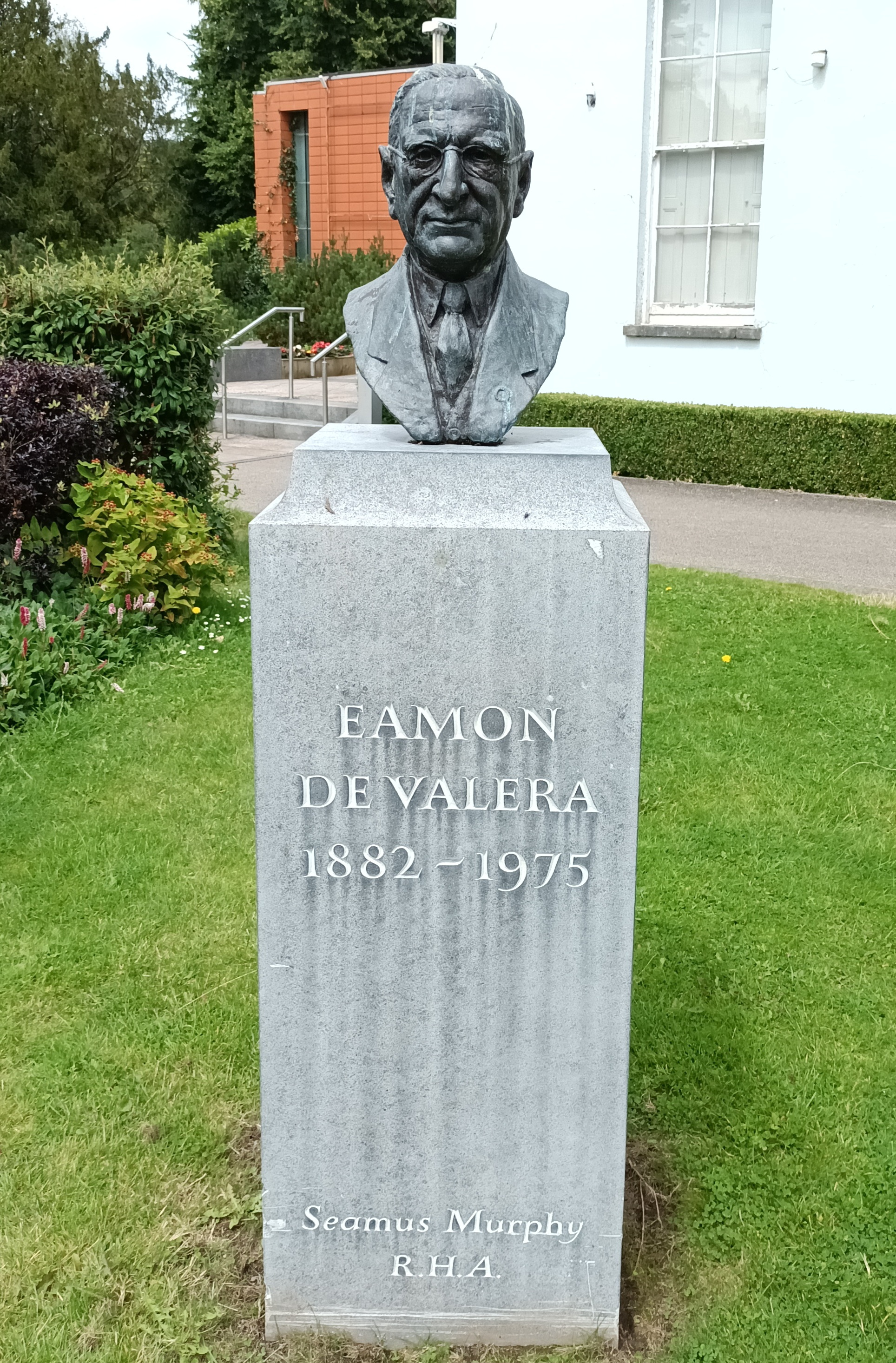
Éamon de Valera, Fitzgerald's Park, Cork

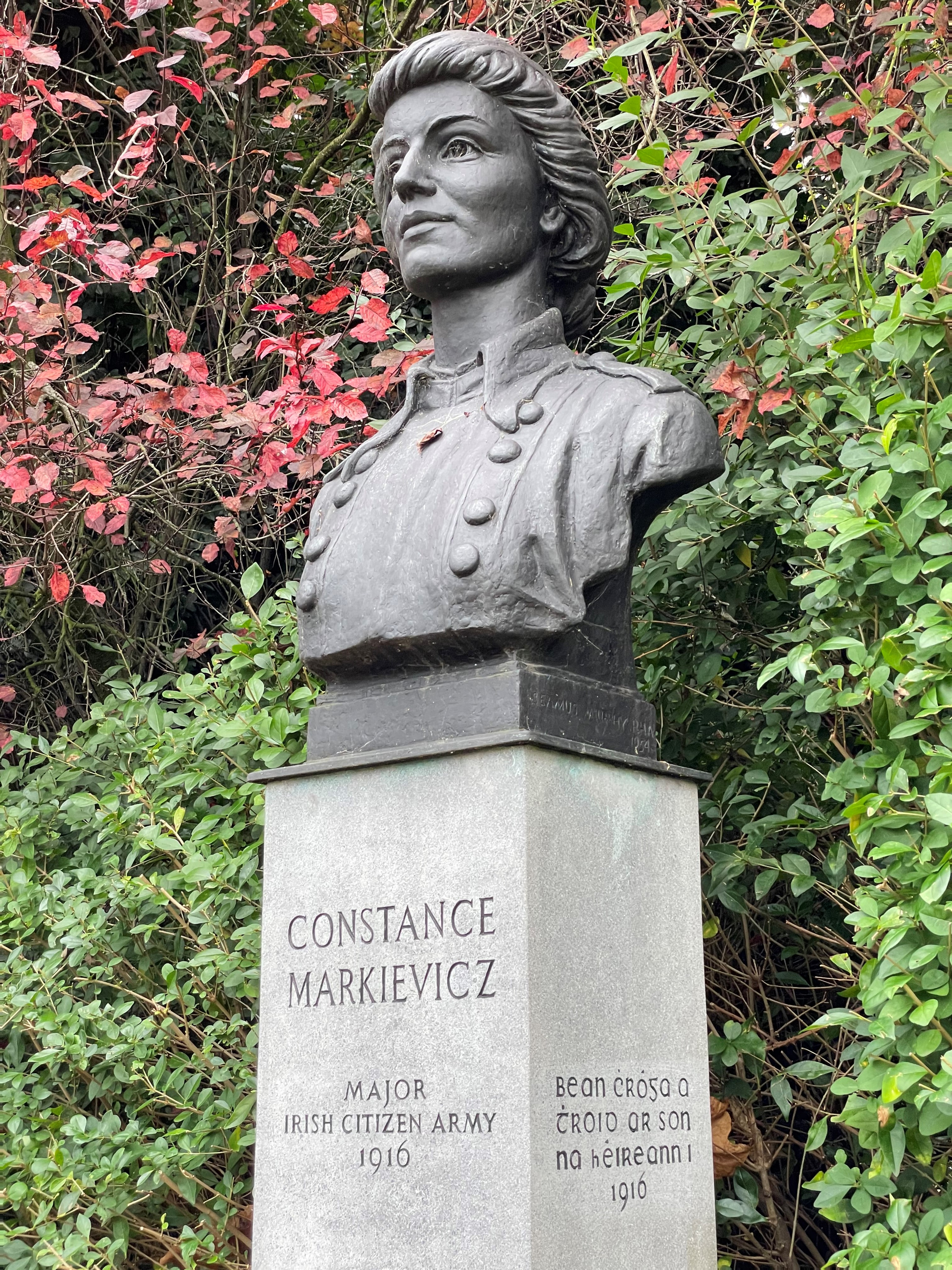
Constance Markievicz

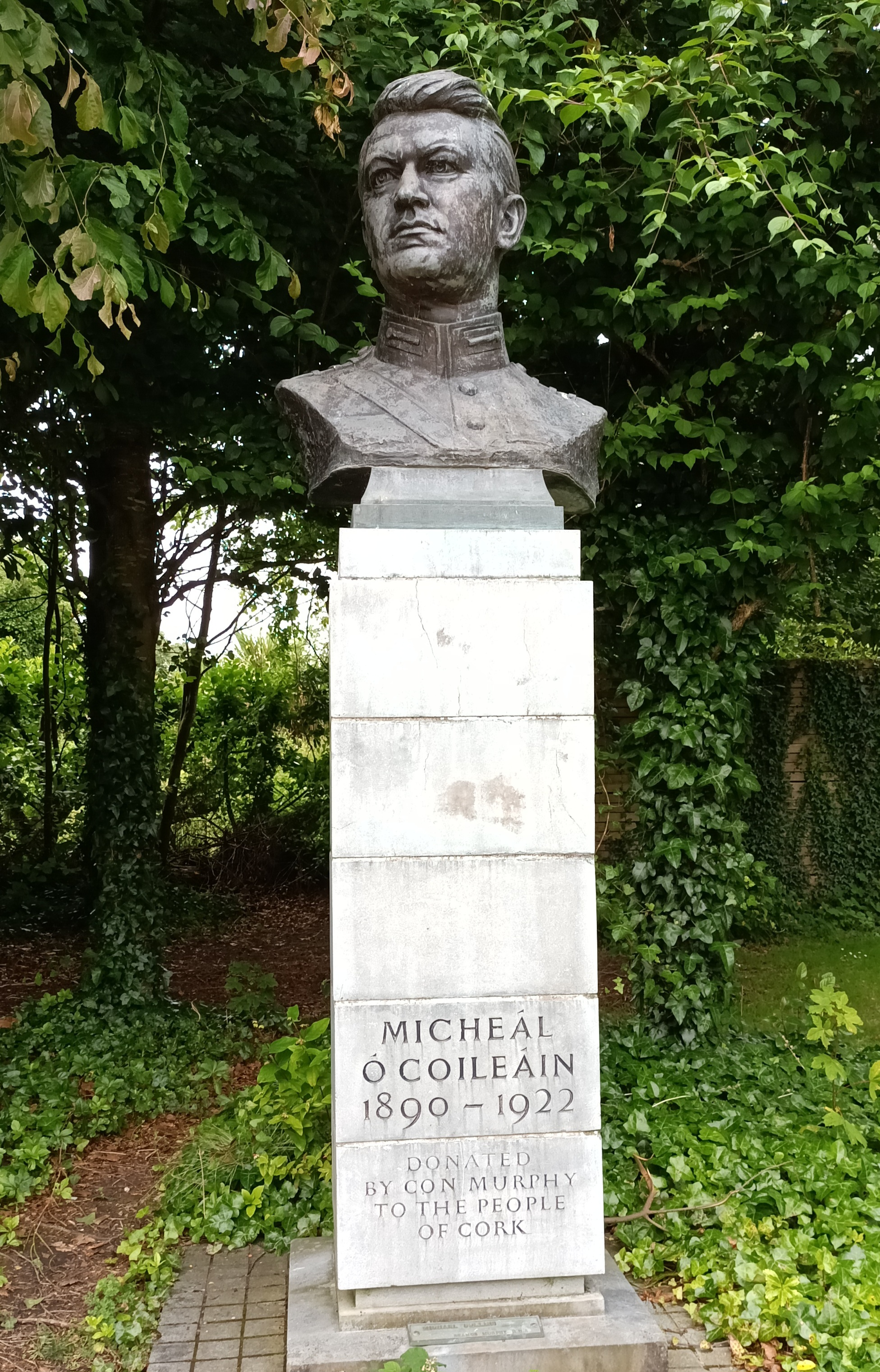
Michael Collins

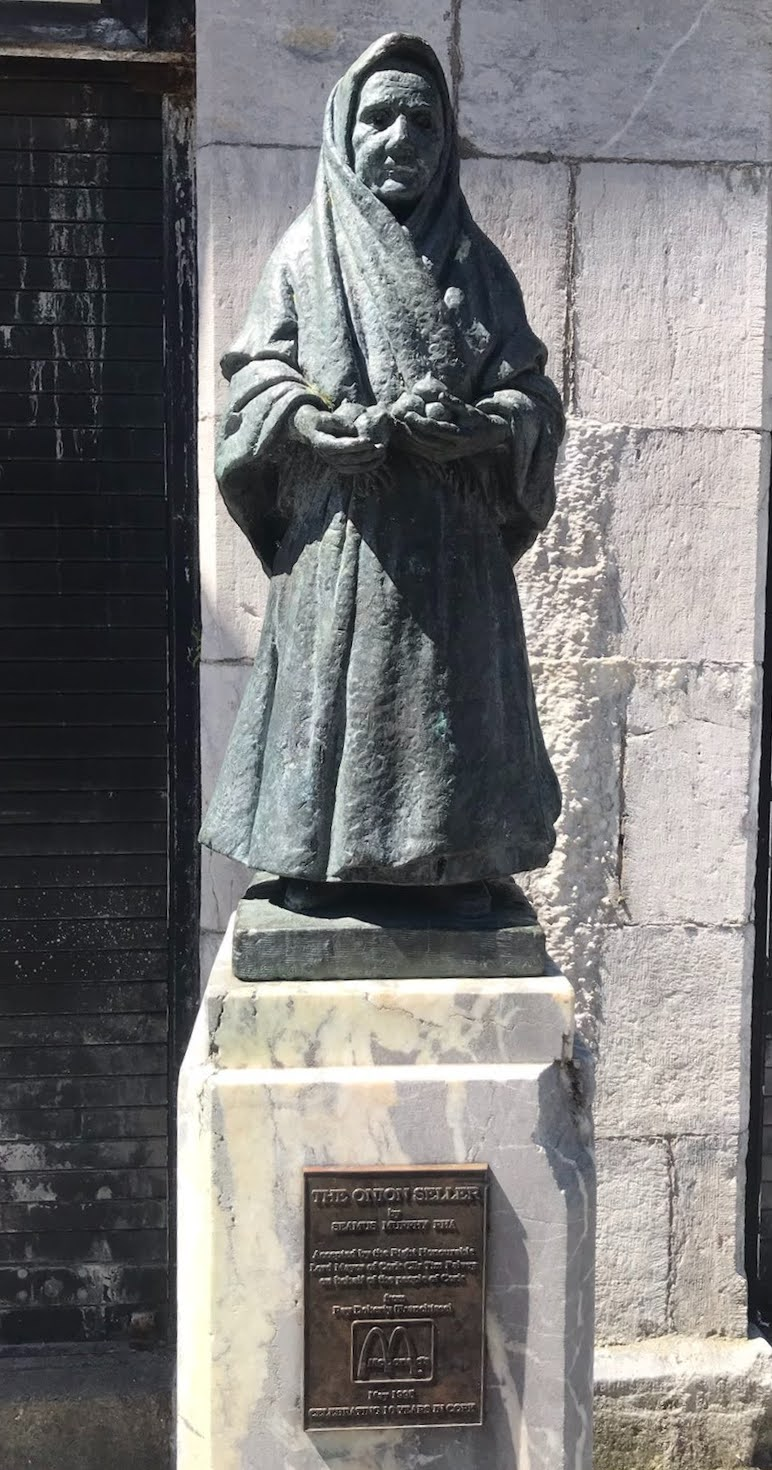
The Onion Seller, St Patrick's Street, Cork

== See also ==
- List of public art in Cork

== Sources ==
- Murphy, Seamus (2005). Stone mad. illustrations by William Harrington. Wilton, Cork: Collins Press. ISBN 978-1903464816.
