= Crab Apple Jelly =

1944 short story collection by Frank O'Connor

First UK edition

Crab Apple Jelly is a 1944 short story collection by Frank O'Connor. It includes the following stories:

- The Bridal Night
- Old Fellows
- The Grand Vizier's Daughters
- Song Without Words
- 'The Star That Bids The Shepherd Fold' (alternative title: The Shepherds)
- The Long Road to Ummera
- The Miser
- The House That Johnny Built
- The New Teacher (alternate title: The Cheapjack)
- The Luceys
- Uprooted
- The Mad Lomasneys

According to the critic Richard Ellmann, "crab apple jelly" was O'Connor's description of the "sweet and tart mixture" he aimed for in his work generally. Ellmann adds, "[O'Connor's] best stories stir those facial muscles which, we are told, are the same for both laughing and weeping."
