= Daniel Corkery (author) =

Irish politician, writer and academic (1878–1964)

Senator
- In office 14 August 1951 – 22 July 1954
- Constituency: Nominated by the Taoiseach

Personal details
- Born: 14 February 1878 Cork, Ireland
- Died: 31 December 1964 (aged 86) Cork, Ireland
- Party: Fianna Fáil
- Education: St Patrick's College, Dublin

Daniel Corkery (Irish: Dónall Ó Corcora; 14 February 1878 – 31 December 1964) was an Irish politician, writer and academic. He is known as the author of The Hidden Ireland, a 1924 study of the poetry of eighteenth-century Irish language poets in Munster.

== Academic career ==
Corkery was born in Cork city and educated at Presentation Brothers College before training as a teacher at St Patrick's College, Dublin. He taught at Saint Patrick’s School in Cork, but resigned from there in 1921 when he was refused the headmastership. Among his students there were writer Frank O'Connor and sculptor Séamus Murphy.

After leaving St. Patrick's, Corkery taught art for the local technical education committee, before becoming inspector of Irish in 1925 and Professor of English at University College Cork in 1930. Among his students in UCC were Seán Ó Tuama. Corkery was often a controversial figure in academia for his 'nativist' views on Irish literature. His views sometimes resulted in conflict with scholars of the Irish language, including Pádraig de Brún and de Brún's niece Máire Mhac an tSaoi. Ó Tuama, however, was a frequent defender of Corkery's reputation.

In his late twenties, he learnt Irish and this brought him into contact with members of the Irish language revival movement, including Terence MacSwiney, T. C. Murray and Con O'Leary, with whom he founded the Cork Dramatic Society in 1908. His plays Embers and The Hermit and the King were performed by the society. Later plays were staged at the Abbey Theatre, including The Labour Leader (1919) and The Yellow Bittern (1920). He also wrote short stories, including the collections A Munster Twilight (1916), The Hounds of Banba (1920), The Stormy Hills (1929), Earth Out of Earth (1939), The Wager, and other stories (1950), and a novel, The Threshold of Quiet (1917).

His non-fiction included The Hidden Ireland (1924), a work about the riches of eighteenth-century Irish poetry. In this he attempted to reconstruct a worldview preserved by Gaelic poets amongst the poor and oppressed Catholic peasantry of the Penal Laws era, virtually invisible in the Anglo-Irish tradition that had dominated the writing of Irish history. "An instant, influential classic", wrote Patrick Walsh, "its version of the past provided powerful cultural underpinning to the traditional nationalist history that became, in the 1930s, the educational orthodoxy of the new state".

Corkery lived on Gardiners Hill in Cork and in 1931 was elected president of his local GAA club, Brian Dillons.

Corkery's papers are held in the Boole Library of University College Cork.

== Political career ==
He was a member of Seanad Éireann for Fianna Fáil from 1951 to 1954 when he was nominated by the Taoiseach.

== General ==
Every year, in the third week of July, the Daniel Corkery Summer School is held in the village of Inchigeelagh, County Cork. Activities include landscape painting, Irish translation, choral singing, lectures, sessions, and concerts.

== Works ==
- A Munster Twilight, Talbot Press, Dublin, 1917.
- The Threshold of Quiet, Talbot Press, Dublin; T. Fisher Unwin, London, 1917.
- The Labour Leader, Talbot Press, Dublin; T.Fisher Unwin, London, 1920
- The Yellow Bittern, and other plays, Talbot Press: Dublin; T. Fisher Unwin: London, 1920.
- The Hounds of Banba, Talbot Press, Dublin, T. Fisher Unwin, London, 1921.
- I Bhreasail. A book of lyrics, Elkin Mathews, London, 1921.
- The Hidden Ireland, M. H. Gill & Son, Dublin, 1924.
- The Stormy Hills, Jonathan Cape: London (printed Dublin), 1929.
- Synge and Anglo-Irish Literature: A study, Cork University Press, 1931.
- Earth out of Earth, Talbot Press, Dublin & Cork, 1939.
- Resurrection, Talbot Press: Dublin, 1942.
- What's this about the Gaelic League?, Conradh na Gaeilge, Dublin, 1942.
- The Wager, and other stories, illustrated by Elizabeth Rivers, Devin-Adair, New York, 1950.
- The Fortunes of the Irish Language, C. J. Fallon, Dublin, 1954.

== See also ==
- D. P. Moran
