= The Road to Stratford =

- Author: Frank O'Connor
- Language: English
- Subject: William Shakespeare
- Genre: Literary criticism
- Published: 1948
- Publisher: Methuen Publishing
- Publication place: United Kingdom
- Media type: Print: hardback
- Pages: 149
- Dewey Decimal: 822.33

The Road to Stratford is a 1948 work on William Shakespeare and Elizabethan theatre, written by Frank O'Connor. It was published in Britain by Methuen. A revised edition was published in the US in 1960 as Shakespeare's Progress.
