= The Stories of Frank O'Connor =

1952 short story collection by Frank O'Connor

- Author: Frank O'Connor
- Publisher: Knopf
- Publication date: 1952

The Stories of Frank O'Connor is a 1952 short story collection by Frank O'Connor featuring both old and new stories.

== Stories ==
The new stories appearing here in book form for the first time were:

- My Oedipus Complex
- My Da
- The Pretender
- First Love
- Freedom
