= Domestic Relations =

1957 short story collection by Frank O'Connor

First US edition (publ. Knopf)

Domestic Relations is a 1957 short story collection by Frank O'Connor.

== Stories ==
It includes the following stories:

- The Genius
- The Study of History
- The Man of the World
- The Duke's Children
- Daydreams
- Private Property
- A Bachelor's Story
- The Pariah
- Expectation of Life
- The Ugly Duckling
- Orphans
- A Salesman's Romance
- Fish for Friday
- Pity
- The Paragon
