= Mary Manning (writer) =

Irish novelist, playwright and film critic

- Born: 30 June 1905; Dublin, Ireland
- Died: 25 June 1999 (aged 93); Cambridge, Massachusetts
- Other names: Mary Howe, Mary Adams
- Occupation: writer

Mary Manning Howe Adams (30 June 1905 – 25 June 1999) was an Irish novelist, playwright and film critic. She lived and worked in both Dublin, Ireland and Cambridge, Massachusetts, where she married and had a family. She was one of the founders in 1950 of the Poets' Theatre in Cambridge.

== Biography ==
Born and raised in Dublin, Ireland, Mary Manning got her theatre training in Sara Allgood's teaching class in the Abbey Theatre. She had gone to school in Morehampton House and Alexandra College, Dublin. She also worked as a writer for the Gate Theatre. She adapted the short story "Guests of the Nation" for a film directed by Denis Johnston. Manning also helped found the Dublin Film Society in 1930. In this society, she co-founded Irish Amateur Films. When she led this group, they produced four films in 1930. She worked as a film critic and co-founded the Gate Theatre arts magazine Motley in 1932.

In 1935 Manning moved to Boston, Massachusetts. There she later met and married lawyer Mark De Wolfe Howe, who had clerked for Chief Justice Oliver Wendell Holmes. When married to him, Mary continued to work by writing plays and three novels. After World War II, Mark De Wolfe Howe became part of the faculty at Harvard Law School, his alma mater, and the official biographer of Holmes.

The couple had three daughters: Susan, Fanny, and Helen. Susan Howe became a poet, scholar and critic. In the summer of 1936, Mary Manning had a brief affair with Samuel Beckett, which led to a rumour that he was the biological father of her eldest daughter, Susan. But Susan Howe has stated that DNA tests show Beckett was not her father.

Fanny Howe also achieved notability as a poet.

Manning continued her creative activities beyond the family. During World War II, she worked as drama director at Radcliffe College.

In 1950 Manning was among the founders of The Poets' Theatre in Cambridge, Massachusetts. Others included poets and writers Thornton Wilder, William Carlos Williams, Edward Gorey, and Alison Lurie. It was one of the first places in the United States to host performances of poetry. In 1953 it held the premiere of Dylan Thomas's Under Milk Wood. The theatre flourished until 1962, when the building burned down. It was later revived in the 1980s, running to 2004. It was revived again in the 21st century; a non-profit was set up in 2023 and the first performances held that year.

After her husband Mark died in 1967, Manning returned to Dublin. She lived in Monkstown, Dublin for another ten years. During this time Manning wrote reviews, essays and criticism for various publications, such as Hibernia, The Irish Times, and The Atlantic.

She returned to the US in the late 1970s to live again in Cambridge, Massachusetts.

After Manning returned to the US, she married the lawyer Faneuil Adams of Boston, Massachusetts in 1980.

Manning died on 27 June 1999, at the age of 93 years old. She died at Mt. Auburn Hospital in Cambridge, Massachusetts.

== Ireland's two waves of silent film ==
From 1914 to 1926, Ireland had numerous new films being produced, largely in the genres of historical melodramas and romantic comedies. Following this, the period of 1930 to 1935 was when a second wave of silent films were produced that were intended to be less cliched. The films were more experimental and dealt less with the commercial appeals of the first wave.

There's minimal information on how Manning contributed to the second wave, but she was said to have a role in producing five of the six films released during that period.

Prior to her career as a writer and filmmaker, Mary Manning worked as a film critic throughout the 1920s and '30s. She worked as a film critic for the Irish Statesman for a year until it went out of business. She was known to disapprove of Hollywood's "unimaginable stories and its stereotypical portrayal of Ireland and the Irish".

== Bibliography ==
=== Writings ===
- Adams, Bernard. Denis Johnston: A Life. Dublin: Lilliput, 2002.
- Advertisement. Irish Times (20 August 1930): 6.
- Irish Times (23 August 1930): 6.
- Irish Times (26 August 1930): 6.
- Irish Independent (23 August 1930): 8.
- Irish Independent (26 August 1930): 6.
- Barton, Ruth. Irish National Cinema. New York: Routledge, 2004.
- Casella, Donna R. “Women and Nationalism in Indigenous Irish Filmmaking of the Silent Period.” In Researching Women in Silent Cinema: New Findings and Perspectives. Eds. Monica Dall’Asta, Victoria Duckett, and Lucia Tralli. Bologna: University of Bologna, 2013. 53–80.
- “From Lantern to Slide Show.” Memories in Focus. Raidió Teilifís Éireann (RTÉ), Dublin. 27 April 1995. Television. IED, RTÉ.
- Howe, Fanny. Personal Interview. 10 July 2015.
- Howe, Susan. Personal Interview. 11 June 2015.
- "Irish Amateur Films." Irish Times. (26 August 1930): 6.
- “Irish Amateur Film Society.” Dublin Evening Mail (30 August 1930): 2.
- “Irish Productions Find Their Feet.” Memories in Focus. Raidió Teilifís Éireann (RTÉ), Dublin. 4 May 1995. Television. IED, RTÉ.
- "Irish Girl Makes Film Name.” The Sunday Chronicle (6 July 1930): n.p. Norris Davidson file, Liam O’Laoghaire Archives. NLI
- “Irish Playwright – Critic – Novelist Mary Manning Adams is Dead at 93. Obit. Playbill. 1 July 1999. http://www.playbill.com/news/article/irish-playwright-critic-novelist-mary-manning-adams-is-dead-at-93-82864
- Johnston, Denis. “3rd Omnibus X Book.” Denis Johnston Papers (MS 10066/181/95/194). TC
- Manning, Mary. "Dublin-Cum-Elstree." Irish Statesman (30 November 1929): 254–56.
- "The Fairchild Family at the Films.” Motley (November 1933): 12–14.
- "Hail Veidt!" Motley (March 1933): 10–12.
- “Mary Manning.” In Enter Certain Players: Edwards-MacLiammóir and the Gate 1928-1978. Ed. Peter Luke. Dublin: Dolmen Press 1978. 35–39.
- "A Silent Interlude." Irish Statesman (28 September 1929): 72–73.
- "The Voice of Ireland." Motley (February 1933): 14–15.
- "What is the Wild West Saying?” Irish Statesman (22 February 1930): 496–98.
- "Why Not a Repertory Cinema?" Motley (September 1932): 14–15.
- “Mark de Wolfe Howe Dies; Lawyer, Historian Was 60.” Obit. The Harvard Crimson. (1 March 1967) http://www.thecrimson.com/article/1967/3/1/mark-de-wolfe-howe-dies-lawyer/
- “Mary M. Adams, 93; Irish Novelist and Playwright.” Obit. The Boston Globe (27 June 1999): 7.
- “Mary Manning Howe Adams.” Obit. Irish Times (8 July 1999): 19.
- “Producing Films in Ireland.” Irish Independent (26 August 1930): 10.
- Programme, Guests of the Nation. 16 March 1960. Guests of the Nation clippings file. IED-TML
- Rockett, Kevin. “Part One: History, Politics and Irish Cinema.” In Kevin Rockett, Luke Gibbons and John Hill, Cinema and Ireland. London: Croom Helm, 1988. 1–126.
- Rockett, Kevin and Emir Rockett. Irish Film and Television Research Online. 15 March 2012. http://www.tcd.ie/irishfilm/
- Trotter, Mary. Ireland’s National Theaters: Political Performance and the Origins of the Irish Dramatic Movement. Syracuse: Syracuse University Press, 2001.

=== Filmography ===
- A. Archival Filmography: Extant Film Titles:
- 1. Mary Manning as Actress, Adapter, Company Co-founder, and Miscellaneous Crew By Accident. Dir.: J. N. G. (Norris) Davidson, asst. dir./casting: Mary Manning, sc.: Norris Davidson (Irish Amateur Films IE 1930) cas.: C. Clarke-Clifford, Olive Purcell, Mary Manning, Paul Farrell, si, b&w, 16mm. Archive: IED, RTÉ.
- 2. Mary Manning as Adapter, Company Co-founder and Miscellaneous Crew Guests of the Nation. Dir.: Denis Johnston, adp./props: Mary Manning (Denis Johnston Productions IE 1935) cas.: Barry Fitzgerald, Frank Toolin, Cyril Jackson, Charles Maher, Georgina Roper, Fred Johnson, Shelah Richards, Cyril Cusack, Hilton Edwards, si, b&w, 35mm. Archive: IED, GBB.
- 3. Mary Manning as Company Co-founder and Miscellaneous Crew Screening in the Rain. Cam.: J. N. G. (Norris) Davidson, misc. crew: Mary Manning (Irish Amateur Films IE 1930) cas.: Mary O’Moore, Grace McLoughlin, Judge Johnston, Lord Longford, Hilton Edwards, Micheál MacLiamóir, si, b&w (tinted), 16mm. Archive: IED, RTÉ.
- B. Filmography: Not Extant Film Titles:
- 1. Mary Manning as Director and Company Co-founder Bank Holiday, 1930.
- 2. Mary Manning as Company Co-founder and Miscellaneous Crew Pathetic Gazette, 1930.

=== Plays ===
- Go, Lovely Rose
- Youth's The Season...? (Published in Plays of Changing Ireland, edited by Curtis Canfield [New York: Macmillan, 1936].)
- Storm over Wicklow
- Happy Family
- The Voice of Shem: Passages from Finnegans Wake Freely Adapted for the Theatre (London: Faber & Faber, 1958)

=== Books ===
- Mount Venus
- Lovely People
- The Last Chronicles of Ballyfungus
