= Denis Johnston =

Irish writer (1901–1984)

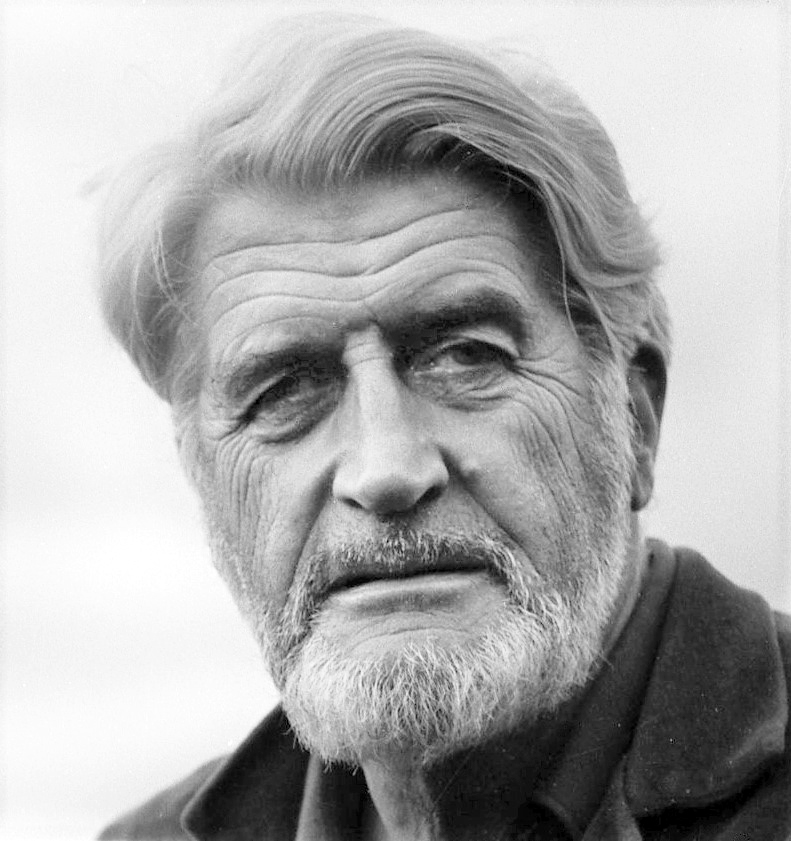
- Johnston in 1968
- Born: 18 June 1901
- Died: 8 August 1984 (aged 83)
- Writing career
- Genres: Plays; war correspondence; literary criticism

(William) Denis Johnston (18 June 1901 – 8 August 1984) was an Irish writer. Born in Dublin, he wrote mostly plays, but also works of literary criticism, a book-length biographical essay of Jonathan Swift, a memoir and an eccentric work on cosmology and philosophy. He also worked as a war correspondent, and as both a radio and television producer for the BBC. His first play, The Old Lady Says "No!", helped establish the worldwide reputation of the Dublin Gate Theatre; his second, The Moon in the Yellow River, has been performed around the globe in numerous productions featuring such storied names as James Mason, Jack Hawkins, Claude Rains, Barry Fitzgerald, James Coco and Errol Flynn. Later plays dealt with the life of Swift, the Easter Rising of 1916, the pursuit of justice, and the fear of death. He wrote two opera libretti and a pageant.

== Early life ==
Johnston was the only child of William John Johnston from Magherafelt, a barrister (later an Irish Supreme Court judge), and his wife, Kathleen (née King), a teacher and singer from Belfast. They were Presbyterians and liberal home rulers. Johnston was to see the family home in Dublin occupied by rebels during the 1916 Easter Rising.

Johnston was educated at St Andrew's College, Dublin (1908–15, 1917–19), and Merchiston Castle School, Edinburgh (1915–16). In 1918, he attempted to join Sinn Féin, offering to supply the party with weapons taken from his Officer Training Corps. In 1922, while reading history and law at Christ's College, Cambridge (1919–23) he tried to enlist in the civil-war Free State army. His time at Cambridge was a success: in addition to graduating with MA (Cantab.) and LLM degrees, he was also elected President of the Cambridge Union in 1921. He went on to study at the Harvard Law School (1923–4) and entered King's Inns (Dublin) and the Inner Temple (London).

In London, developing his interest in the theatre, Johnston abandoned plans for a legal and political career.

== Career ==
Johnston was a protégé of Yeats and Shaw, and had a stormy friendship with Seán O'Casey. He was a pioneer of television and war reporting. He worked as a lawyer in the 1920s and '30s before joining the BBC as a writer and producer, first in radio and then in the fledgling television service. His broadcast dramatic work included both original plays and adaptations of the work of many different writers.

"Passionate in his radical scepticism and loathing of what he saw as the pernicious influence of the Roman Catholic Church", at the end of 1933, Johnston joined the trade unionist John Swift, the Dublin novelist Mary Manning, and fellow northerner, the socialist Jack White, in forming The Secular Society of Ireland. "Convinced that clerical domination in the community is harmful to advance", the society sought "to establish in this country complete freedom of thought, speech and publication, liberty for mind, in the widest toleration compatible with orderly progress and rational conduct". Among other things it aimed to terminate ”the clerically-dictated ban on divorce”, “the Censorship of Publications Act” and “the system of clerical management, and consequent sectarian teaching, in schools.”

This was at a time of heightened clerical militancy and as soon the meeting place of the Society (from which it distributed the British journal The Freethinker) was exposed, it had to shift to private houses outside of Dublin. In 1936 Johnson and the other members wound the society up and donated the proceeds to the government of the beleaguered Spanish Republic. Johnston had become a recognised man of the left: in 1930 he had joined the Irish Friends of Soviet Russia, and though never a party member, until as late as the 1950s he professed faith in a communist future.

During the Second World War he served as a BBC war correspondent, reporting from El Alamein, through the Italian campaign, to Buchenwald and Hitler's Berghof. For this he was awarded an OBE, a Mention in Despatches, and the Yugoslav Partisans Medal. He then became director of programmes for the television service.

Johnston later moved to the United States and taught at Mount Holyoke College, Smith College and other universities. He kept extensive diaries throughout his life, now deposited in the Library of Trinity College Dublin, and these together with his many articles and essays give a distinctive picture of his times and the people he knew. Another archive of his work is held at the library of Ulster University at Coleraine. He received honorary degrees from the University of Ulster and Mount Holyoke College and was a member of Aosdána.

Denis and actress Shelah Richards were the parents of Jennifer Johnston, a respected novelist and playwright, and a son, Micheal. His second wife was the actress Betty Chancellor, with whom he had two sons, Jeremy and Rory.

== Critical acclaim ==
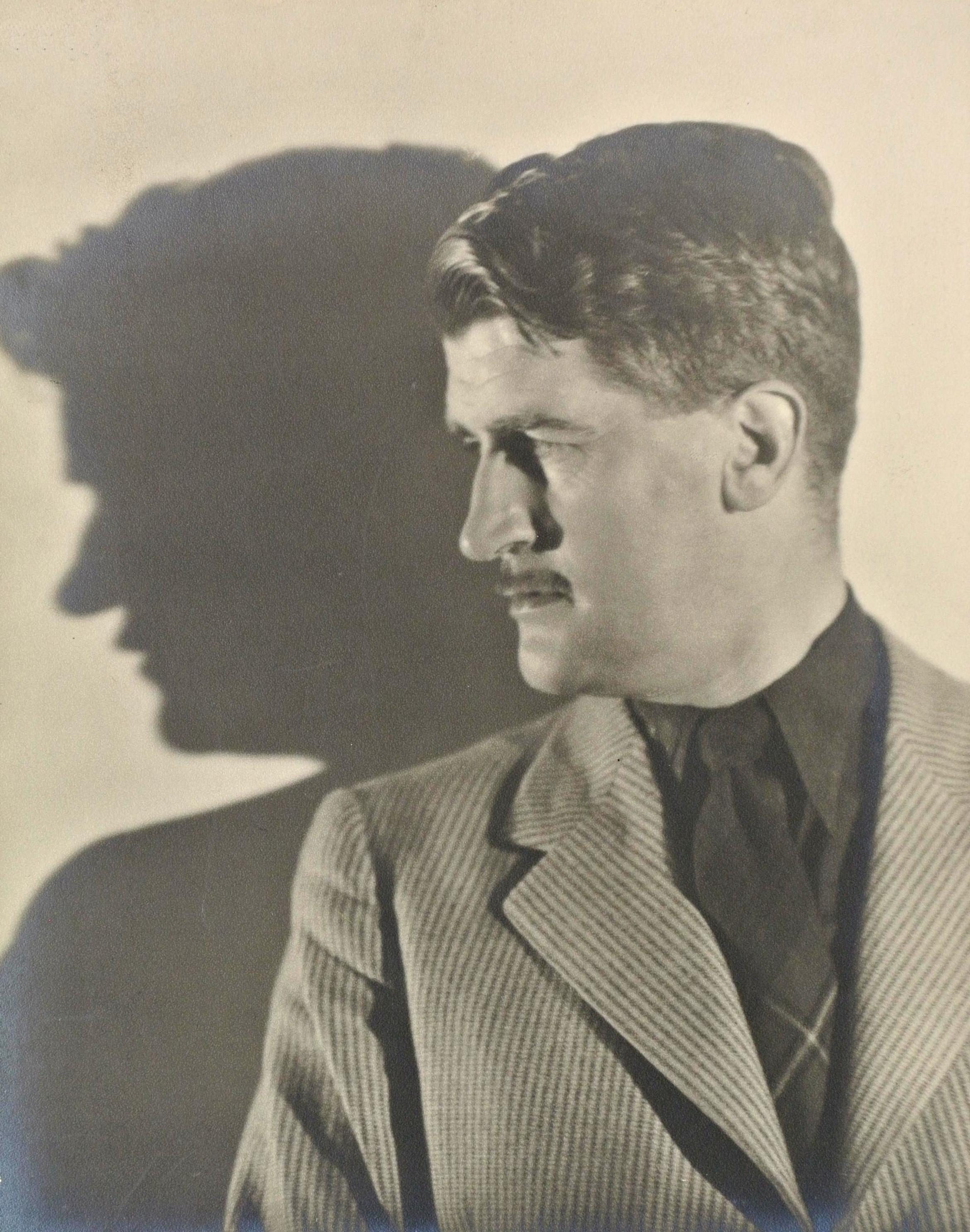
Denis Johnston c. 1930

Hilton Edwards, who first directed The Old Lady Says "No!", said that the script "read like a railway guide and played like Tristan and Isolde."

Reviewing The Moon in the Yellow River in The New York Times, Brooks Atkinson wrote "Mr Johnston does not explain; he irradiates." Set in 1927 during an attempt by the IRA to destroy an Irish Free State government power plant, a later New York Times review of the play's 1961 revival noted an "exhilaratingly mad, comic strain." But acclaim was not universal. Irish writer and broadcaster (and later member of the Irish Senate) Denis Ireland remarked that the play's success in London was "natural enough" for "it fulfils the first law of Anglo-Irish literature: it makes the native Irish appear a race of congenital idiots."

Johnston's war memoir Nine Rivers from Jordan reached The New York Times' Best Seller list and was cited in the World Book Encyclopedia's 1950s article on World War II under "Books to Read", along with Churchill, Eisenhower et al. Joseph Ronsley cites an unnamed former CBS Viet Nam correspondent who called the book the "Bible", carrying it with him constantly, "reading it over and over in the field during his tour of duty."

In a profile in The New Yorker in 1938, Clifford Odets is quoted as saying that the only playwrights he admired were John Howard Lawson, Sean O’Casey, and Denis Johnston.

Johnston's tribute to Dublin, "Strumpet city in the sunset", from the closing speech of The Old Lady says "No!", has achieved its own fame. James Plunkett titled his epic novel of Dublin before the First World War Strumpet City. A travel guide written by Harvard students in introducing Dublin made a classic misattribution: "James Joyce loved his 'Strumpet city in the sunset'".

The Denis Johnston Playwriting Prize is awarded annually by Smith College Department of Theatre for the best play, screenplay or musical written by an undergraduate at Smith, Mount Holyoke, Amherst and Hampshire Colleges and the University of Massachusetts Amherst. The prize was endowed by his former student at Smith, Carol Sobieski.

== Works ==
Stage plays

Synopses of the plays can be found at Denis Johnston on Irish Playography.

- The Old Lady Says "No!" (1929)
- The Moon in the Yellow River (1931)
- A Bride for the Unicorn (1933)
- Storm Song (1934)
- Blind Man's Buff (1936) (with Ernst Toller)
- The Golden Cuckoo (1939)
- The Dreaming Dust (1940)
- A Fourth for Bridge (1948)
- 'Strange Occurrence on Ireland's Eye' (1956)
- Tain Bo Cuailgne – Pageant of Cuchulainn (1956)
- The Scythe and the Sunset (1958)

Biography

- In Search of Swift (1959)
- John Millington Synge (Columbia University Press 1965)

Autobiography

- Nine Rivers from Jordan (1953)
- Orders and Desecrations (1992) (ed. Rory Johnston)

Non-fiction

- The Brazen Horn (1976)

Opera libretti

- Six Characters in Search of an Author (1957)

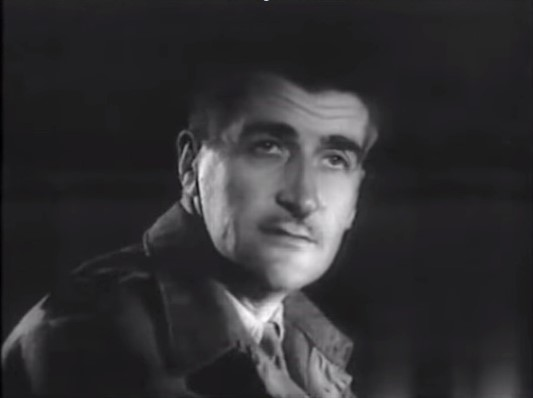
Denis Johnston from The True Story of Lili Marlene

- Nine Rivers from Jordan (1968)

Adaptations for the stage

- Six Characters in Search of an Author (1950) (translation from Pirandello)
- Finnegans Wake (1959) (from Joyce)

Films

- Guests of the Nation (1935) (director)
- Riders to the Sea (1935) (acted the part of Michael)
- Ourselves Alone (1936)
- The True Story of Lilli Marlene (1944)

== Bibliography ==
- Adams, Bernard. Denis Johnston: A Life. Lilliput Press, 2002.
- Barnett, Gene A. Denis Johnston. Twayne's English Authors Series No. 230. G.K. Hall & Co., 1978.
- Ferrar, Harold. Denis Johnston's Irish Theatre. Dolmen Press, 1973.
- Igoe, Vivien. A Literary Guide to Dublin. Methuen, 1994.
- Johnston, Denis. The Dramatic Works of Denis Johnston (3 vols.). Colin Smythe, 1979.
- Ronsley, Joseph, ed., Denis Johnston: a retrospective. Irish Literary Studies No. 8, Colin Smythe, Barnes & Noble Books, 1981.
