= Shelah Richards =

Irish actress and director (1903–1985)

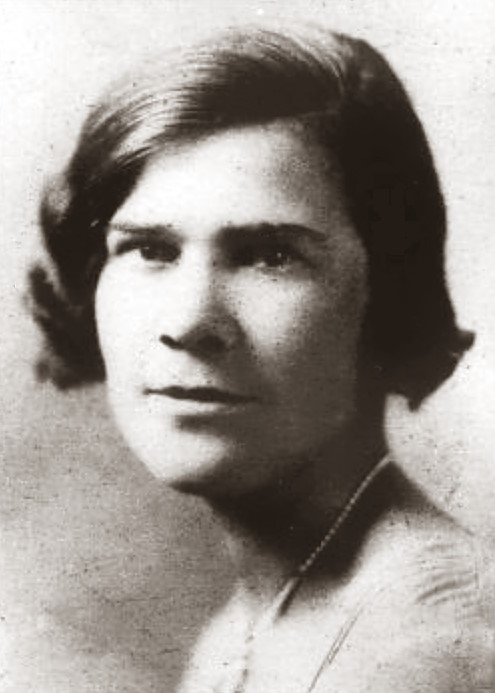
- Born: Shelah Geraldine Richards; 23 May 1903; Dublin, Ireland
- Died: 19 January 1985 (aged 81)
- Known for: Actress, producer

Shelah Geraldine Richards (23 May 1903 – 19 January 1985), was an Irish actress, manager, director and producer.

== Early life ==
Shelah Geraldine Richards was born on 23 May 1903 in Dublin, to John William Richards and Adelaide Roper. Her father was a lawyer and her mother was a suffragist who had chained herself to the railings in St Stephen's Green. Richards went to school in Alexandra College, Dublin and after that she went to a finishing school in Paris. Though her family was not in the arts, her godmother was Beatrice Elvery. Richards attended her salons with her parents as a child. She met W. B. Yeats when she was 16. Her niece Geraldine Fitzgerald, her sister Edith Catherine Richards' daughter, was also one of Ireland pre-eminent actresses.

== Career ==
Richards' acting career started while attending the Dublin drama league and she was asked at short notice to replace Eileen Crowe in Juno and the Paycock, playing the role of Mary Boyle in the Abbey Theatre production. Richards got the role of Nora Clithero in the 1926 production of The Plough and the Stars, O'Casey's next production. This role meant that she ended up with police protection for the duration of the run due to the disturbances the play engendered. Another important role was to take on playing the lead in The Player Queen by Yeats. Maire O'Neill had previously made the role her own, Yeats had let no one perform the part since then so taking on such a challenge was intimidating. Richards continued to take on leading roles with the Abbey Theatre but in 1926 she also began to direct.

On 28 December 1928 Richard married playwright Denis Johnston in St Anne's Church in Dublin. She toured the US with the Abbey players in 1932 and with the Irish Players in the mid 30s. A role in 1938 in Molly Keane's Spring Meeting starring Gladys Cooper and A. E. Matthews took her to Broadway in New York. War in Europe broke out while the run was still going on and Richards was advised to stay in the United States. However by then she had two children, producer Micheal and novelist Jennifer Johnston. So Richards returned to Dublin. There she ran her own theater company at the Olympia Theatre, Dublin with Nigel Heseltine. Her marriage to Johnston, broken in 1938, ended with divorce in February 1945.

Richards' next challenges was to take over the Abbey School of Acting. During her time there one of the designers she worked with was Louis le Brocquy. With Siobhan McKenna she produced The Playboy of the Western World in Edinburgh to huge success allowing her to stage it in London and Dublin and later in Toronto's Library Theater. She brought Marcel Marceau to Dublin for the first time. She continued to act and had some film roles.

== Television career ==
In 1961 Ireland launched its first television service, Raidió Teilifís Éireann. Richards was one of the first producers, recommended to the station by Hilton Edwards. She was one of the few women in the new station. The first Irish play produced during the opening week was directed by her and she was nominated for a Best Actress award in another production, Inquiry at Lisieux. She worked as producer on a wide number of programs for the station including documentaries, soap operas and religious programming. Both Tolka Row and The Riordans were produced by her as well as Denis Johnston's The Moon on the Yellow River, Shaw's Arms and the Man and Synge's Riders to the Sea.

Richards retired from her RTÉ career in the early 1970s though she continued to raise funds for the Gate Theatre through the Edwards–MacLiammóir Playhouse Society. In 1983 for her 80th birthday the Abbey put on a party for her which included a special rendition of "Nora" from The Plough and the Stars. Richards was the last living member of the original 1926 cast. The song was repeated at her funeral in 1985. She died in Ballybrack, County Dublin on 19 January 1985. Her funeral was held in St. Anne's Church in Dublin and she was cremated in Glasnevin.
