= Guests of the Nation =

Short story by Frank O'Connor

- Short story by Frank O'Connor
- First appearance in The Atlantic Monthly, January 1931 (pages 80–87)
- Country: Ireland
- Language: English

Publication
- Published in: The Atlantic
- Publication type: Periodical
- Publication date: January 1931

"Guests of the Nation" is 1931 short story by Irish author Frank O'Connor, first published in The Atlantic Monthly in January 1931. It depicts the summary execution of two British Army hostages by the Irish Republican Army (IRA) during the Irish War of Independence. The story is split into four sections, with each section being written using a different stylistic tone; it begins by depicting the friendship between the British hostages and their IRA captors, until they are suddenly ordered to summarily execute the hostages in retaliation for the execution of four IRA prisoners. The story was adapted for a 1935 film directed by Denis Johnston. Neil McKenzie's stage adaptation of O'Connor's story received an Obie Award for best one-act play in 1958.

== Plot ==
The story begins with two British Army privates, Hawkins and Belcher, being held hostage by the Irish Republican Army (IRA) near Ballinasloe, County Galway during the Irish War of Independence. The hostages play cards and argue about politics, religion and girls with their IRA captors, Bonaparte and Noble, while being housed in the cottage of an old lady who collaborates with the IRA. She tends to the hostages but is quick to scold both them and their captors if they displease her. Bonaparte and Noble become friends with Hawkins and Belcher, but their superior Jeremiah Donovan, the commanding officer of the local IRA flying column, remains aloof from everyone else in the cottage.

On one evening, Donovan reminds Bonaparte and Noble that Hawkins and Belcher are hostages and not prisoners, and if the British authorities execute any IRA prisoners, then the two Englishmen will be summarily executed in retaliation. This disturbs Bonaparte and he struggles to face Hawkins and Belcher on the next day. A few days later, Feeney, an IRA intelligence officer, arrives at the cottage and informs Donovan that four IRA prisoners have been executed, and Hawkins and Belcher are to be shot in retaliation. Donovan passes this on to Bonaparte and Noble, who are deeply saddened. In order to get the two hostages out of the cottage, Donovan lies to them and says that they are merely being transferred; on the way down a path into a nearby peat bog, he tells them the truth. At first, Private Hawkins does not believe him. But as the truth settles in, Hawkins begs Donovan not to kill him, arguing that, if their positions were reversed, he would never shoot "a pal". He also requests his captors to allow him to desert and join the IRA in order to be spared death, but they refuse to answer him.

Bonaparte, racked with misgivings about executing Hawkins and Belcher, secretly hopes that they attempt to escape and plans to let them go if they try and do so. He realises that he now regards them as human beings, rather than as part of a faceless enemy. Despite Hawkins’ pleadings, Donovan shoots him in the back of his head. As Belcher fumbles to tie a blindfold around his own eyes before he is executed, he notices that Hawkins is still alive and tells Bonaparte to "give him another." Donovan then shoots Belcher in the head, and the captors digs a shallow grave in the bog and bury the two hostages in them. Feeney leaves and the captors return to the cottage, where the old woman asks what they have done with the hostages. They do not answer her, but she immediately understands and falls sobbing to her knees to pray for both men's souls. Noble does the same, while Bonaparte leaves the cottage and looks up at the night sky feeling small and lost. He says that he has never felt the same way about anything that happened to him since.

== Characters ==
=== Belcher ===
A large Englishman who is one of the hostages, he was the quieter of the two who ingratiated himself with the old woman of the house by helping her with her daily chores. Belcher had made her his friend for life. Belcher on realising his fate seemed to accept it as “whatever unforeseen thing he’d always been waiting for had come at last”. His sense of organisation sees him preparing his own blindfold for his execution. His courage and generosity sees him request of his executioners that they finish off Hawkins first before he meets his own fate. This is further demonstrated in Belcher's acknowledging to his executioners that they are only doing their duty. Belcher's whole character and personality is found in his last statement. His lover “went away with another fellow and took the kid with her. I like the feeling of a home, as you may have noticed, but I couldn't start another again after that”.

=== Hawkins ===
The second hostage made his captors look like fools when he showed that he knew the country better than they did. Hawkins knew Mary Brigid O’Connell and had learned to dance traditional dances such as the Walls of Limerick. Hawkins had too much old talk and as a result lost at cards. He always argued with Noble into the early hours. He worried Noble about religion with a string of questions that would "puzzle a cardinal". He had a deplorable tone and he could throw bad language into any conversation. A communist and agnostic, Hawkins always argued with Noble about capitalism and religion. When it came to his execution Hawkins could not believe his fate and thought his friends were joking. Hawkins's terror at the prospect of death highlights the futility of the conflict in terms of humanity and the friendships that developed between the captors and hostages. The execution of Hawkins provides a chilling climax to this episode.

=== Jeremiah Donovan ===
He is not the narrator. Irish soldier who does not like the prisoners. Donovan reddens when spoken to and tends to look down at his feet, yet when it comes time to execute the Englishmen, he is strangely energised and excited. Donovan believes in a questionable interpretation of duty to his country, of which he constantly speaks and which he cites as justification for the execution. When he hears news of the four IRA prisoners being executed, it becomes clear that he unidimensionally believes in taking an eye for an eye. Donovan is the character who commences the act of killing in the execution scene, though it is the narrator's firearm that is first mentioned by the narrator.

=== Noble ===
A young volunteer who along with Bonaparte guarded the hostages. Noble’s character and personality is expressed in the story in his exchanges with Hawkins. Noble is a devout Catholic who had a brother (a priest) and worries greatly about the force and vigour of Hawkins' terrible arguments. Noble shows his humanity in not wanting to be part of a deception, telling the hostages that they were being shifted again. Yet he understood his duty, and undertook the order of preparing the graves at the far end of the bog.

=== Bonaparte ===
The narrator of this story. It's not clear from the story the relationship between Bonaparte and the author, but given O’Connor’s role in the I.R.A some comparisons may well be drawn. Bonaparte has the responsibility of telling a terrible and chilling story about a war of independence. These stories are a testament to the butchery and futility of war. The last paragraph of the story best describes the effect this episode had on both Bonaparte and Noble. Communicating on what happened in the bog to the old lady without saying what they did, the description by Noble of the little patch of bog with the Englishmen stiffening into it, and Bonaparte “very lost and lonely like a child, a stray in the snow. And anything that happened to me afterwards, I never felt the same about again."

=== The old woman ===
The elderly woman of the house in which the soldiers are staying is unnamed.

== Publication ==
"Guests of the Nation" first appeared in the January 1931 issue of The Atlantic Monthly. In September 1931 it was published in London and in New York City by the Macmillan Company, in a short-story collection of the same name. (Note: Guests of the Nation includes 15 short stories: "Guests of the Nation", "Attack", "Jumbo's Wife", "Nightpiece with Figures", "September Dawn", "Machine-gun Corps in Action", "Laughter", "Jo", "Alec", "Soiree Chez une Belle Jeune Fille", "The Patriarch", "After Fourteen Years", "The Late Henry Conran", "The Sisters", and "The Procession of Life".)

"We know of course that soldiers fraternize," wrote Laurence Stallings on the eve of the book's release:

There was hardly ever another such fraternization as this one. Three men of hunted column are hiding two from the hunters, the deed carried through to the last avenging rites, with O'Connor giving you stomach qualms without the least recourse to sentiment as three men murder two friends. The book is like their own whisky—smoky and shocking, but warming with its fierce vapors.

== Influences ==
O'Connor credited Russian author Isaac Babel as the greatest influence on his own work. "'Guests of the Nation' and a couple of the other stories in that book are really imitations of Babel's stories in Red Cavalry", he said in a 1957 interview with The Paris Review.

"Guests of the Nation" was an important influence on the first section of The Crying Game, a 1992 film written and directed by Neil Jordan.

== Adaptations ==
=== Guests of the Nation (film) ===
"Guests of the Nation" was made into a silent film released in 1935, screenplay by Mary Manning, directed by Denis Johnston, and including Barry Fitzgerald and Cyril Cusack.

=== Guests of the Nation (play) ===
Guests of the Nation is a 1958 one-act play adapted by Neil McKenzie from O'Connor's short story. It received a 1958 Obie Award for best one-act play.
