= The Common Chord =

1947 short story collection by Frank O'Connor

First edition (UK)

The Common Chord is a 1947 short story collection by Frank O'Connor.

== Stories ==
It features the following stories:

- News For The Church
- The Custom of the Country
- Judas
- The Holy Door
- Don Juan, Retired
- The Babes in the Wood
- The Frying Pan
- The Miracle
- A Thing of Nothing
- The Stepmother
- Friends of the Family
- Don Juan's Temptation

== Page Count ==
226 pages

== Overview ==
The Common Chord" is a collection of twelve short stories by Irish author Frank O'Connor. The stories delve into the lives of individuals in small Irish towns, exploring themes of human nature, morality, and societal norms with O'Connor's characteristic blend of humor and compassion.
