= Bones of Contention =

1936 short story collection by Frank O'Connor

First edition (UK)

Bones of Contention is a 1936 short story collection by Frank O'Connor featuring the following stories:

- Michael's Wife
- Orpheus and His Lute
- Peasants
- In the Train
- The Majesty of the Law
- Tears - Idle Tears
- Lofty
- The Man That Stopped
- The English Soldier
- Bones of Contention
- What's Wrong With the Country?
- A Romantic
