= Traveller's Samples =

1951 short story collection by Frank O'Connor

First UK edition

Traveller's Samples is a 1951 short story collection by Frank O'Connor. It features the following stories:

- First Confession
- The Man of the House
- The Idealist
- The Drunkard
- The Thief (alternate title: Christmas Morning)
- My First Protestant
- This Mortal Coil
- Old Age Pensioners
- Legal Aid
- The Masculine Principle
- The Sentry
- Jerome
- The Lady of the Sagas
- Darcy in the Land of Youth
