= Znojmo Catacombs =

Underground passages in Znojmo, Czech Republic

Coordinates: 48°51′0″N 16°0′0″E

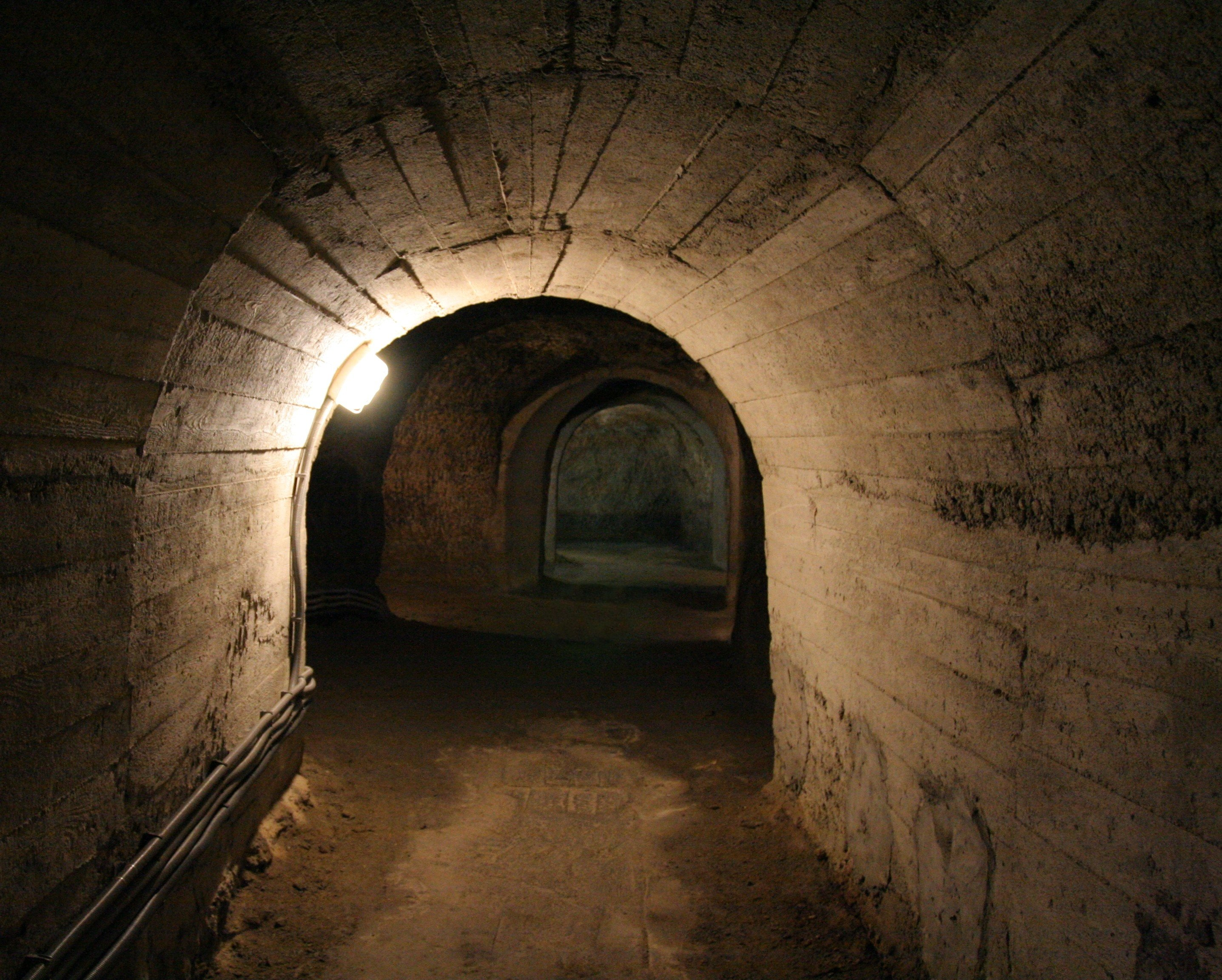
The underground passages of Znojmo

The Znojmo Catacombs are a vast labyrinth of underground passageways, cellars and subcellars situated under the historic city of Znojmo, in the Czech Republic. They were initially developed for defensive purposes.

== Development of the cellars ==
The grottos date back to the 14th century, and were gradually expanded in the 15th century by connecting the individual cellars beneath the houses and palaces in the city into an elaborate labyrinth.

== Uses of the cellars ==
The catacombs were initially created to protect the inhabitants of the city against invading forces. In some places the passageways led under the fortifications and out of the city, allowing the hiding inhabitants to escape from the town to search for food in times of siege.

The caverns were adequately ventilated by air shafts. Fireplaces in the cellars were connected to house chimneys. Smoke could be seen by enemies, emanating from seemingly empty houses, making the town resemble a ghost town. Znojmo's inhabitants could survive for a long time in the refuge due to its wells and a drainage system.

If enemies happened to find an entrance to the cellars, they would have to deal with defensive measures, including slippery slides which would drop invaders into deep wells that could not be scaled without ladders, as well as trapdoors and narrow passageways.

Later the cellars were used for storage, especially the storage of wine.

The catacombs are now a tourist attraction, with a portion of the cellars open to the public April to October for a fee.

== See also ==
- Odessa Catacombs
- Tunnel
- Underground city
- Rock cut architecture
- Znojmo Town Hall Tower
