= Odesa catacombs =

Network of tunnels located under the city of Odesa, Ukraine

Coordinates: 46°32′48″N 30°37′50″E

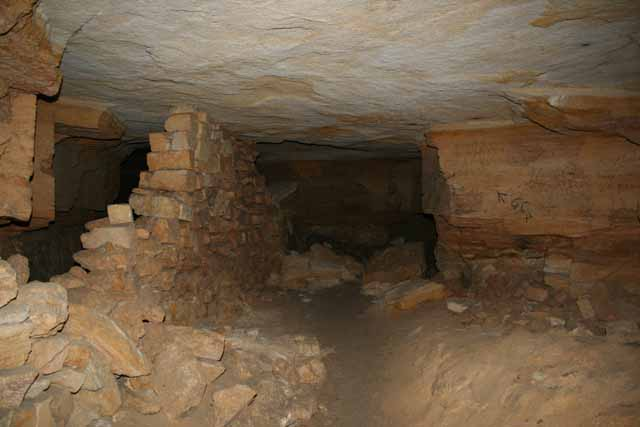
- Catacombs in Nerubaiske
- Interactive map of Odesa catacombs

Immovable Monument of Local Significance of Ukraine
- Official name: Комплекс підземних споруд міста Одеси (Complex of underground structures of Odesa)
- Type: History, Science and Technology
- Reference no.: 979-Од

The Odesa catacombs (Ukrainian: Одеські катакомби) are a labyrinth-like network of tunnels located under the city of Odesa and its outskirts in Ukraine, that are mostly (over 90%) the result of stone mining, particularly coquina. The system of Odesa Catacombs consists of a network of basements, bunkers, drainage tunnels and storm drains as well as natural caves.

The catacombs are on three levels and reach a depth of 60 metres (200 ft) below sea level. It is one of the world's largest urban labyrinths, running up to 2,500 kilometres (1,600 mi). Parts were used as air-raid shelters during World War II. Part of the tunnels, only under the city, were turned into bomb shelters in the Cold War. Such bomb shelters supposed to be refuge for civilians in case of nuclear strike or gas attack.

In the 19th century, most houses in Odesa were built of limestone that was mined nearby. According to urban legend, these mines were abandoned and later used and widened by local smugglers who created a labyrinth of tunnels and hid treasure beneath Odesa. Many of the tunnels have been filled up with earth, concrete or sand by construction companies, and are no longer accessible.

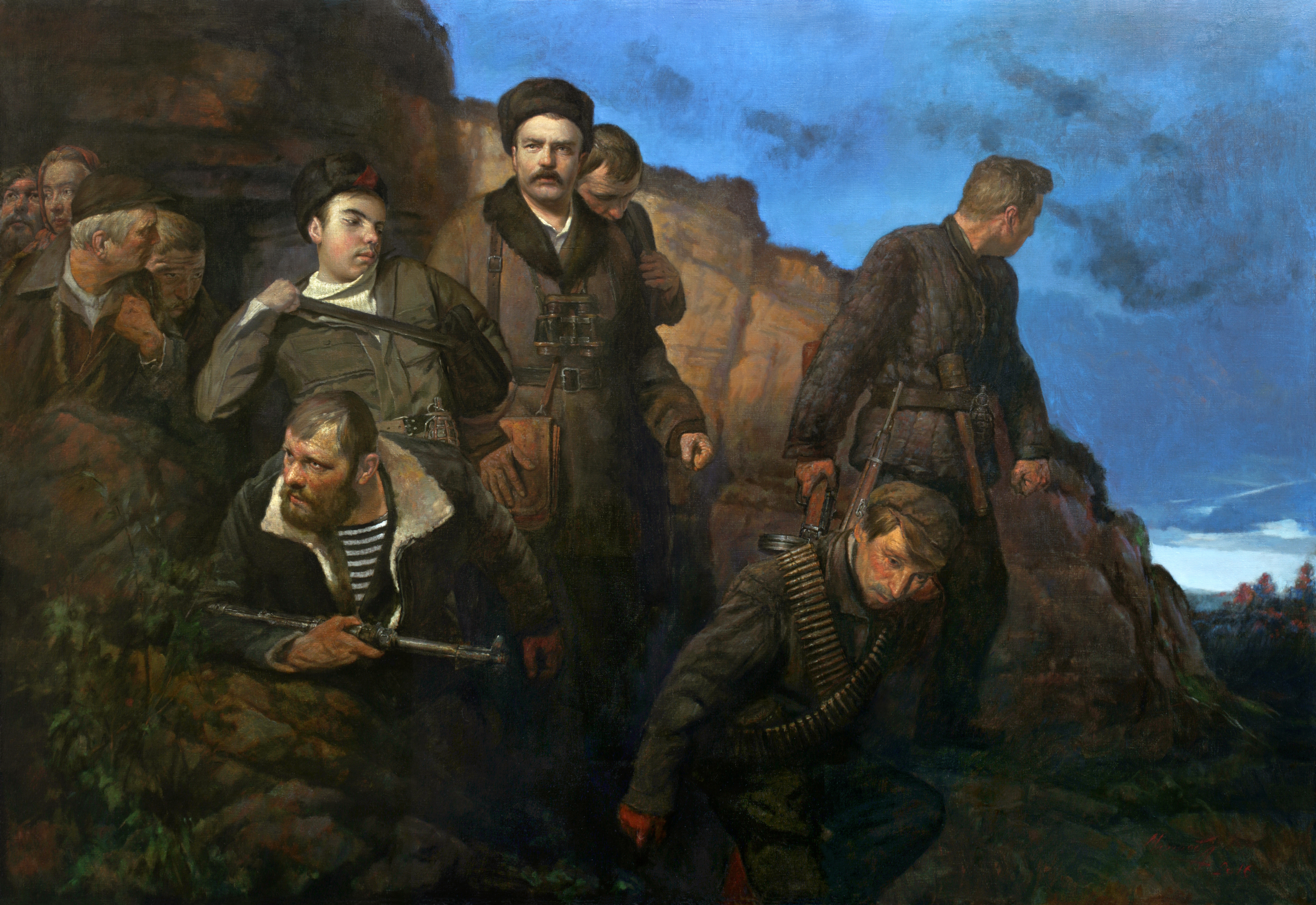
2016 painting, Detachment of Molodtsov near Odesa Catacombs

== Description ==
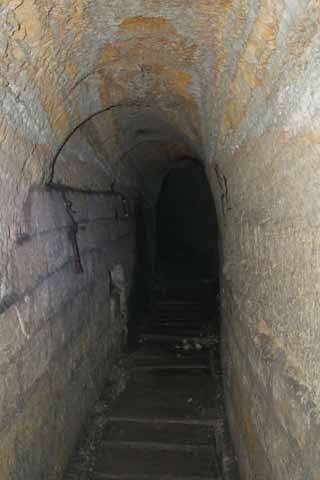

The approximate topography of the Odesa underground labyrinth is unknown as the catacombs have not been fully mapped. It is thought that most (95–97%) of the catacombs are former coquina multilevel mines from which stone was extracted to construct the city above. The remaining catacombs (3-5%) are either natural cavities or were excavated for other purposes such as sewerage. As of 2019, there are more than 1,000 known entrances to the tunnels.

Only one small portion of the catacombs is open to the public, within the "Museum of Partisan Glory" in Nerubaiske, north of Odesa. Other caves attract extreme tourists, who explore the tunnels despite the dangers involved. Such tours are not officially sanctioned because the catacombs have not been fully mapped and the tunnels themselves are unsafe.

== History ==
The first underground stone mines started to appear in the 19th century, while vigorous construction took place in Odesa. They were used as a source of cheap construction materials. Limestone was cut using saws, and mining became so intensive that by the second half of the 19th century, the extensive network of catacombs created many inconveniences to the city.

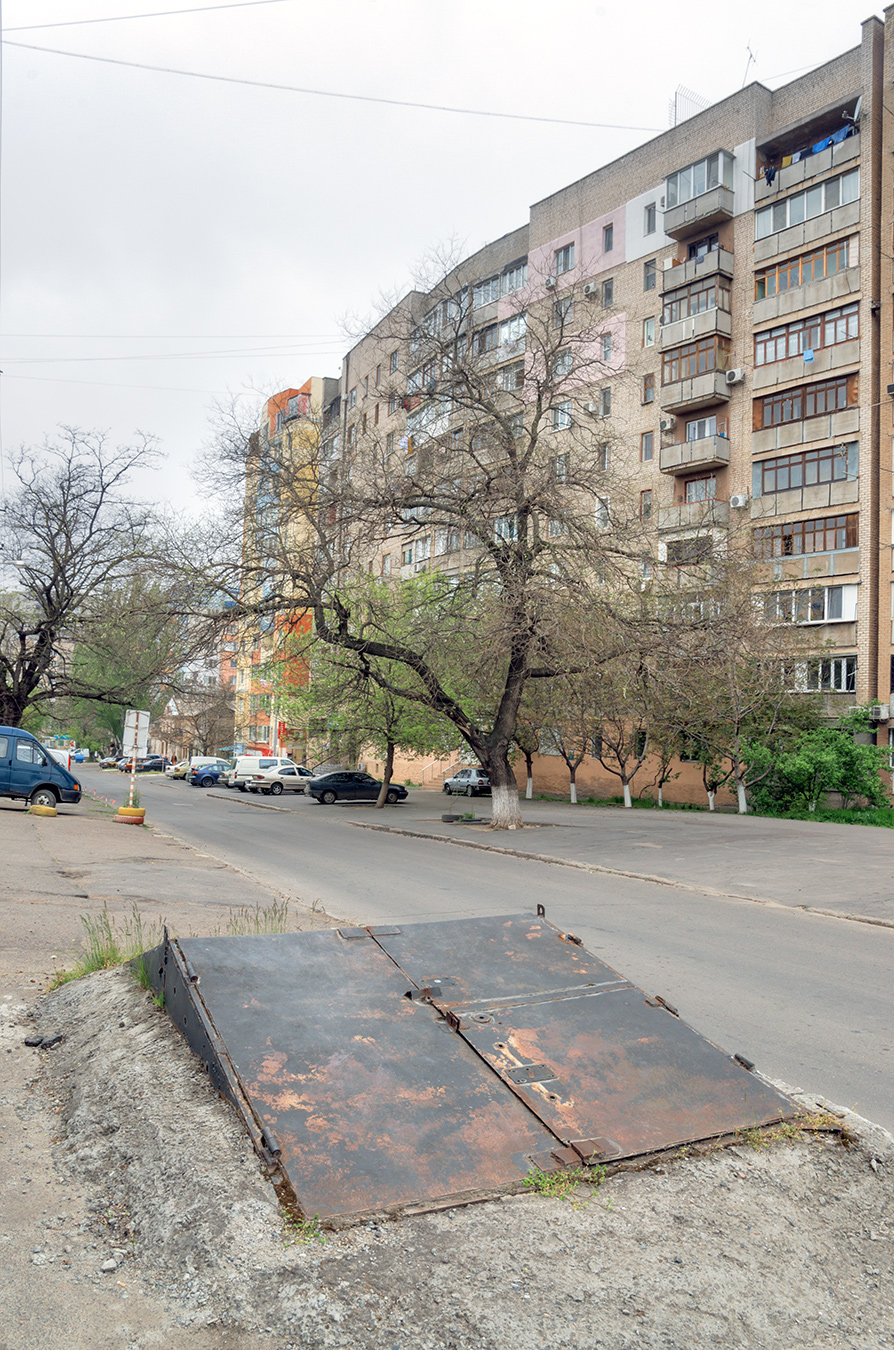
Entrance of catacombs in Moldavanka on Kartamyshevska Street. The entrances of the catacombs have to be closed or controlled at all times to prevent children from entering.

After the Russian Revolution of 1917, stone mining was banned within the central part of Odesa (inside the Porto-Franko zone, bounded by Staroportofrankivska and Panteleimonivska streets).

During World War II the catacombs served as a hiding place for Soviet partisans, in particular the squad of Vladimir Molodtsov. In his work The Waves of The Black Sea, Valentin Kataev described the battle between Soviet partisans against Axis forces, underneath Odesa and its nearby suburb Usatove.

In 1961 the "Search" (Poisk) club was created in order to explore the history of partisan movement among the catacombs. Since its creation, it has expanded understanding of the catacombs, and provided information to expand mapping of the tunnels.

The city has a large population of over 1 million people, which some believe would benefit from the introduction of a subway system. The tunnels have been cited as the reason why such a subway system has never been built in Odesa.

Since the beginning of the 21st century limestone mining has continued in the mines located in Dofinivka, Buldynka, and Velyka Balka near Odesa. As the result of contemporary mining, the catacombs continue to expand.

== Accidental deaths ==
There have been various reports of people walking into the catacombs, getting lost and then eventually dying of dehydration. Perhaps the most famous story dates back to claims made in 2009 by Ukrainian catacombs explorer Eugene Lata. Lata wrote a widely circulated online post stating that he and other explorers had found the body of a local student named Masha, who on New Year's Eve in 2005 had wandered into the catacombs with her friends after drinking.

The group of friends, he wrote, had all stayed there overnight, then left the next morning, but abandoned Masha, either accidentally or on purpose, and she was unable to find her way out. The post featured a graphic photo of what appeared to be a decaying corpse in the catacombs, which Lata claimed was Masha's body. The official Odesa Catacombs website, however, calls the story a hoax.

A 2015 investigation by Vice writer Mike Pearl similarly found no evidence that Masha had existed. Pearl did interview another man, Kostya Pugovkin, who claimed to have dragged the corpse in the photograph up and to a police station in the hope of getting a reward; Pugovkin stated that he was told by others that the dead person was "a Satanist who got lost".

== Fossils ==
Karstic deposits excavated during the quarrying of the catacombs have yielded fossils of mammals dating to the Pliocene epoch (around 3.5 million years ago), including those of the camel Paracamelus alexejevi, the elephant-relative Anancus arvernensis, the three toed horse Hipparion, the tapir Tapirus arvernensis the bears Agriotherium and Ursus, the hyenas Chasmaporthetes and Pliocrocuta, the primitive lynx Lynx issiodorensis and the sabertooth cats Megantereon and Homotherium (with the Odesa catacombs being one of the oldest records of the latter).

== See also ==
- Siege of Odesa (1941)
- Znojmo Catacombs
- Yakov Gordienko
- Kőbánya cellar system
- Mines of Paris
- Beer Quarry Caves
- Caves of Maastricht
