= Kartamyshevska Street =

Street in Odesa, Ukraine

- M. Raskova Street
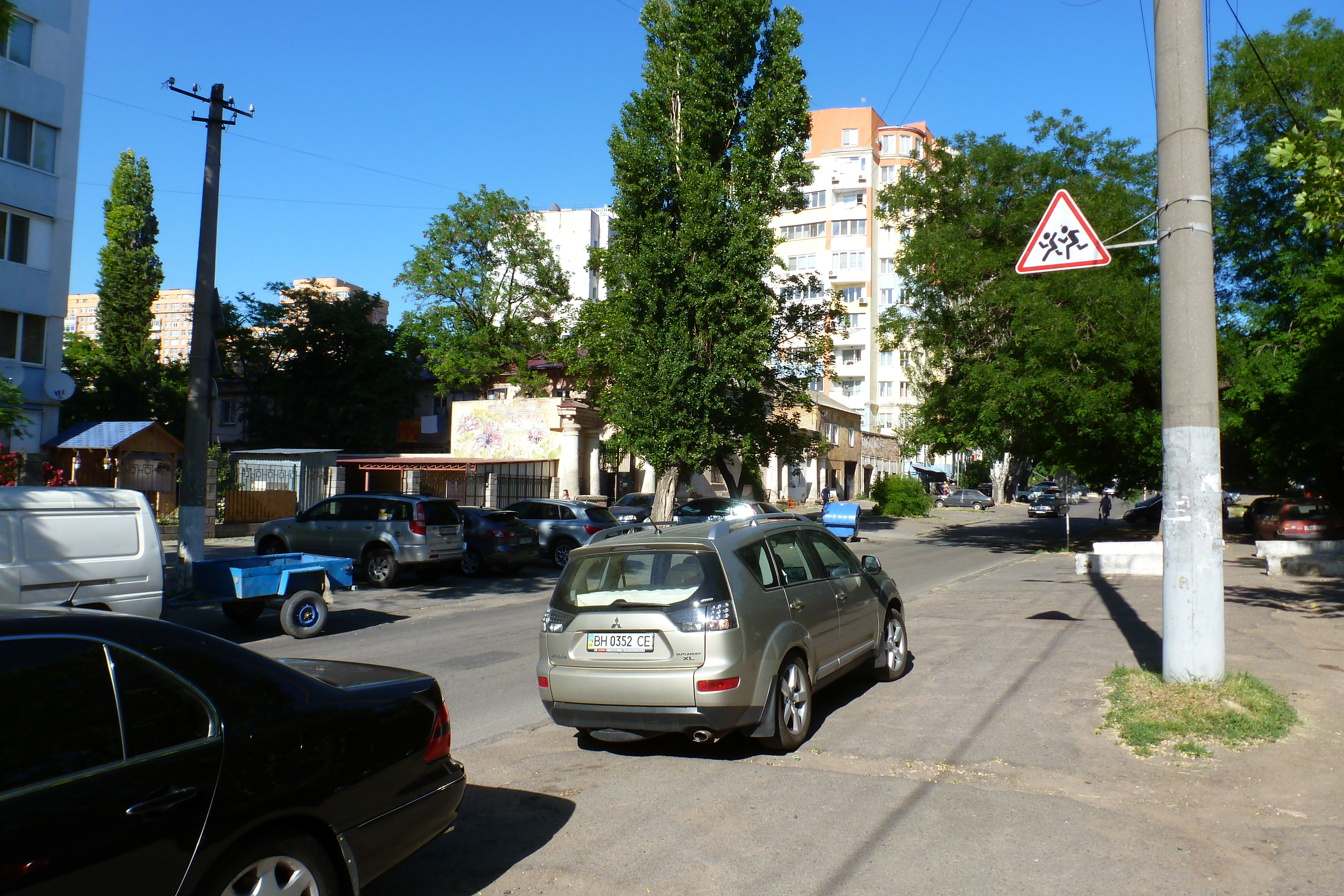
- View from Holokovska Street, 7 June 2017
- Interactive map of Kartamyshevska Street
- Native name: вулиця Картамишевська (Ukrainian)
- Namesake: Kartamyshev
- Postal code: 65091
- Coordinates: 46°28′13.7″N 30°42′43.7″E
- From: 46.470157°N 30.7167°E
- To: 46.47083°N 30.70853°E

Construction
- Construction start: 1802
- Inauguration: 1836

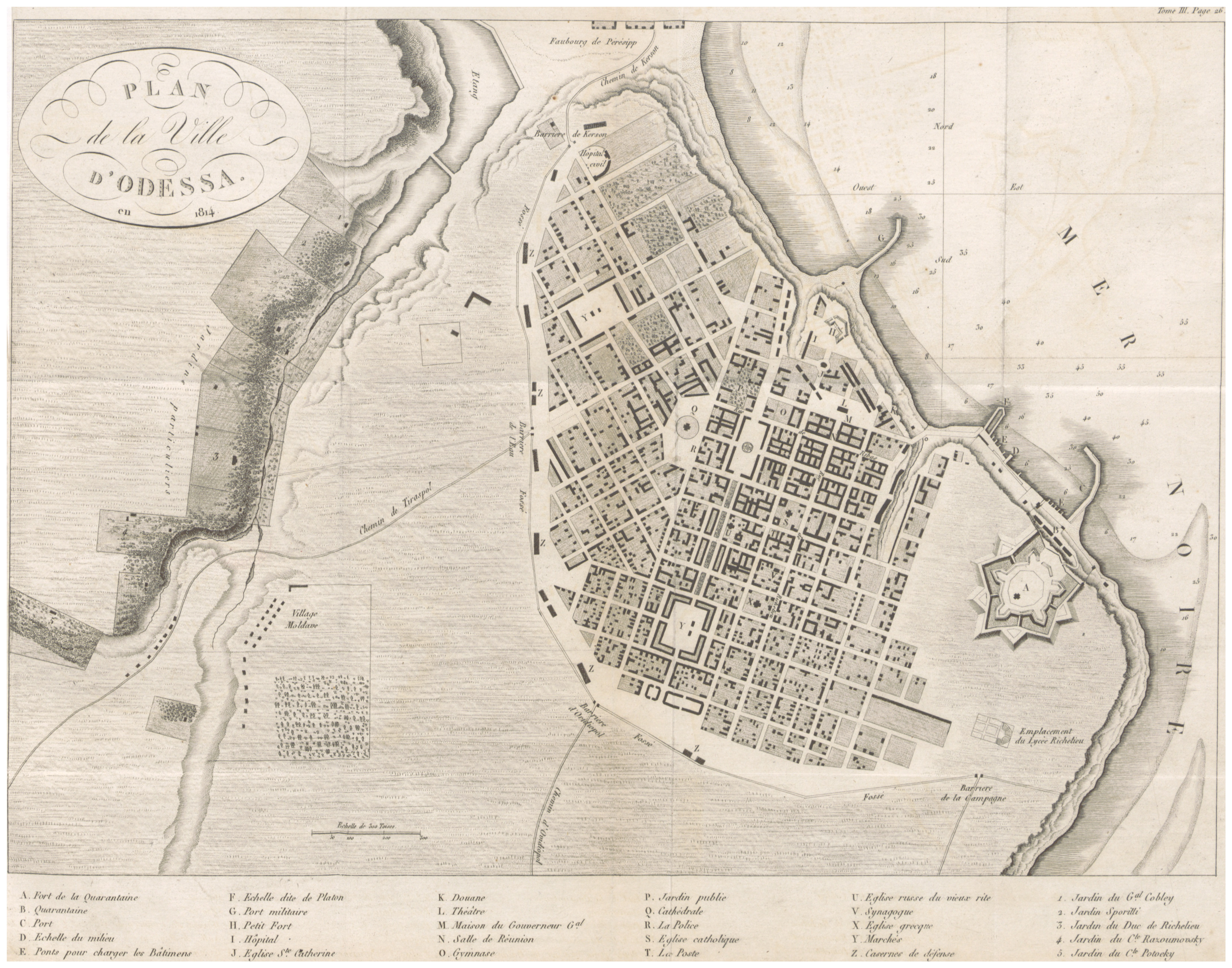
1814 plan of Odesa and the village of Moldavanka

Kartamyshevska Street (Ukrainian: Вулиця Картамишевська) is a street in the historical district of Moldavanka in Odesa, Ukraine. Residents of Odesa refer to the street as Kartamyshevska, omitting the word "street". It is in postal code 65091.

== Formation and name ==
The former Turkish fortress of Hadjibey and its surrounding settlements was renamed Odesa, and officially became a town in 1798. Settlers from elsewhere in Ukraine and Russia began to arrive in the new town and its adjacent settlements, Moldavanka and Peresyp.

Kartamyshev was a noble family name in the Russian Empire which originated in the 17th century. In 1802, Ivan Kartamyshev and his family (including his son Bonifatiy Ivanovich Kartamyshev, born in 1790) moved from Kharkiv to Moldavanka. The Kartamyshev family established a large farm, and their farmhouse was near the beginning of the area between today's Srednyaya and Komityetskaya Streets.

After 1814, Moldavanka was mentioned as a suburb of Odesa. On 7 May 1823, Graf Mikhail Semyonovich Vorontsov was appointed governor-general of New Russia (as the southern provinces of the empire were then called) and namestnik of Bessarabia. The capital and largest city was Odesa. Bonifatiy Ivanovich Kartamyshev was appointed the ratmann and commissioner of Moldavanka by Vorontsov. Kartamyshev, a silk and paper merchant, also owned bookshops in the area.

The three-block street was first drawn on Odesa's General Plan in 1835, although the streets were not named. Present-day Kartamyshevska Street is two blocks long.

== Early history (1835–1939) ==
=== 1836–1850 ===
Kartomyshevska Street was first mentioned in 1836. The first known architect of buildings on the street was N. N. Cherkunov, who built three houses between 1847 and 1850:

- Present-day Holovkovska Street, 1 (at the corner of Kartamyshevska and Holovkovska Streets). The 1847 house, with a shed roof, was rebuilt in the mid-1950s with a flat roof. Its walls were lined with tile during the 1970s.
- An 1848 house (now demolished) built for S. Brinzi at Kartanyshevska, 34
- An 1850 house (also demolished) built for Ye. Savenko at Kartanyshevska, 36

=== 1851–1889 ===
Until 1870, Karamyshevska Street was primarily residential. During the second half of the 19th century, the street gradually took on an industrial character.

In the early 1870s, a windmill at the corner of Komityetska and Kartamyshevska Streets (on the even-numbered side of Kartamyshevska Street) was replaced by a steam mill owned by Turkish consul Rafail Hawa. Hawa also established a small glassworks for the production of bottles and similar vessels on the street. The glassworks was sold to a hat manufacturer named Delpech in 1875. At the turn of the 20th century, two small glassworks (one owned by Wilhelm Sanzenbacher) existed on the street.

=== 1890–1903 ===
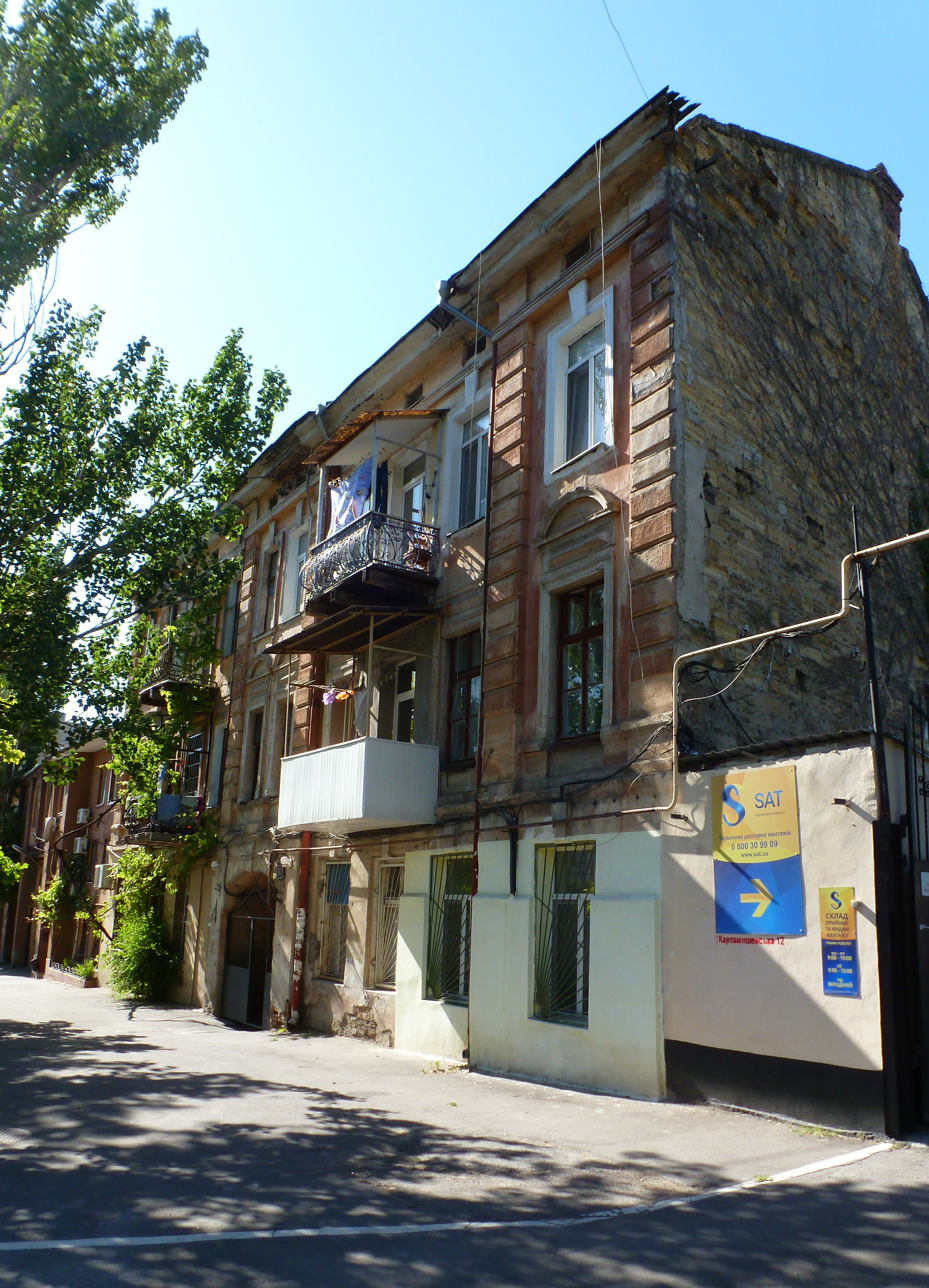
The eclectic-style Kartamyshevska 14, owned by Meer M. Kanela in 1902 and 1903, in June 2017

On behalf of Ivan Solyanikov, Vassily Lobanov petitioned for the construction of a two-storey stone house at the corner of Karamyshevska and Kosvennaya Streets (Kartamyshevskaya Street, 11 and Kosvennaya Street, 76) in 1893; the plan was approved on 16 August of that year. The house's architect was named Ottone. In 1898, the property belonged to A. F. Solyannikova. Kartomyshevska Street was first named on the city map in 1894. A petroleum factory owned by a man named Lang existed on the street in the late 19th century, and a mining engineer named Yushkin was summoned from Grozny to work there.

In 1898, two parcels were on the block between Kertamyshevska and Kosvyennaya Streets:

- Karamyshevskaya, 10, from the corner to the present-day boundary between houses on Kartamyshevskaya street 12 and 14 (including Kartamyshevskaya, 14), owned by M. Posokhov
- Karamyshevskaya, 8, from the corner of Kosvyennaya and Kartamyshevskaya Streets to the present-day boundary between Kartamyshevskaya 12 and 14, owned by H. Wolf and others

The numbering of the even-numbered side of Kartamyshevskaya Street was changed in 1902 and 1903.

=== Revolutionary period (1904-1920) ===
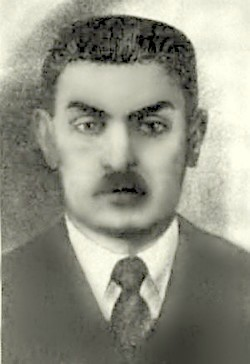
Odesa gangster, revolutionary and military leader Mishka Yaponchik in the 1910s

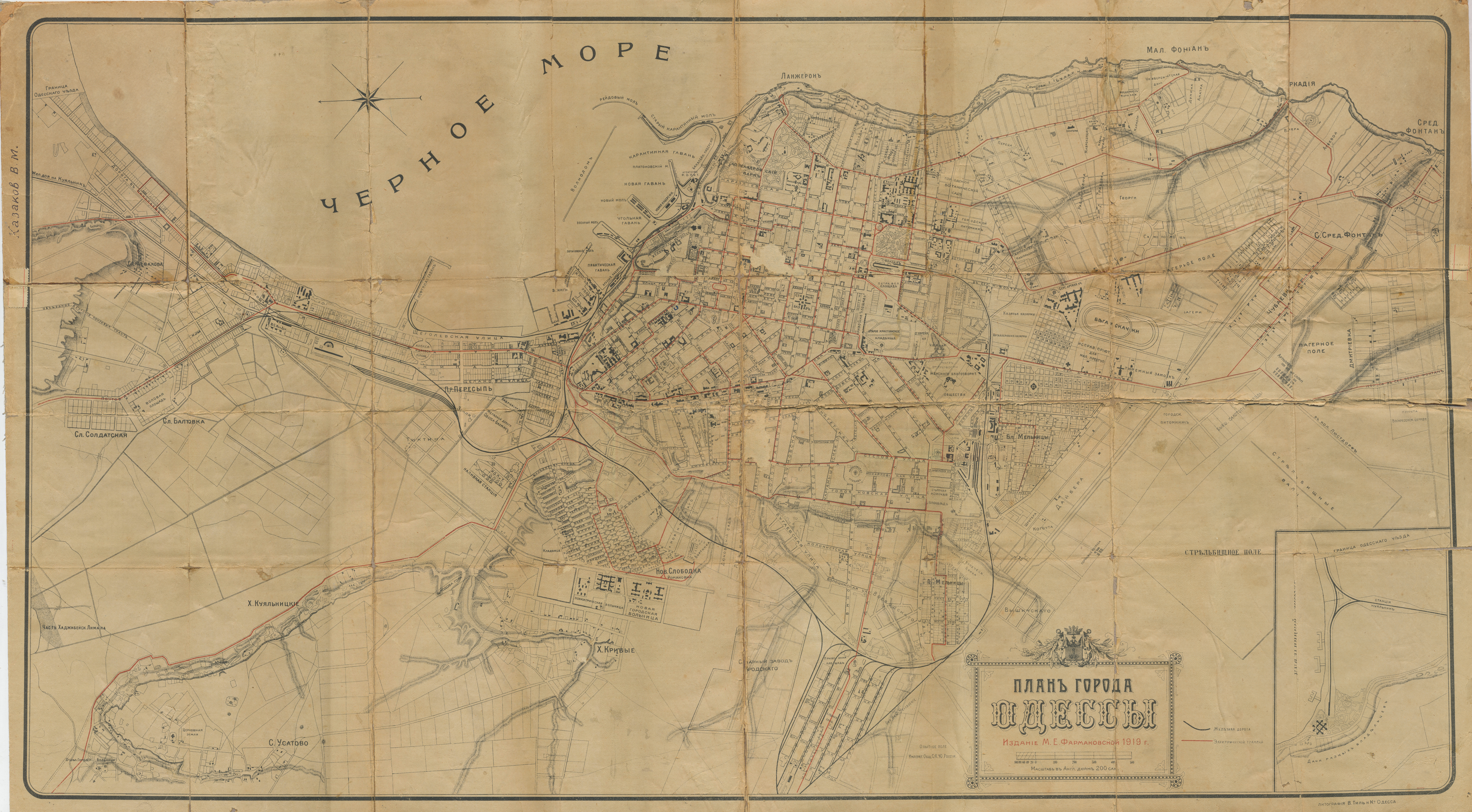
1919 map of Odesa, including electric-train lines

The Russian Empire experienced a revolutionary period between 1904 and 1920, and the Potemkin uprising brought Odesa into the revolutionary movement. From 1918 to February 1920, political power in Odesa changed a number of times until the Red Army installed the Bolsheviks in power. The houses on Kartamyshevska Street were:

- Kartamyshervska Street, 16, at the corner of Kosvyennaya and Karamyshevska Streets. On 30 June 1904, a project was approved for V. N. Posokhova to rebuild one-story stone buildings into premises for people's baths, annex buildings for tanks and boilers, and a single-storey stone outbuilding on Kosvyennaya Street, 41. The project was approved on the same day.
- Kartamyshevska Street, 14: In 1907 and 1908, the parcel was acquired by Abram Yankelevich Soskin. Odesa gangster Mishka Yaponchik and his gang were active from 1905 to 1907 and 1917 to 1919, and used a shed in the courtyard to descend underground and hide from the police.
- Karamyshevskaya Street, 7: Owned by Khana Spivak, the house sheltered a group of revolutionary social democrats who plotted to blow up Russian ships.
- Kartamyshevska street, 26: Purchased by Ivan Chernyavsky and his wife, Yelizaveta Chernyavskaya (née Isakina) after their 1909 marriage.
- Apartment house of Ivan Solyanikov: In 1913, the parcel had two owners: A. F. Solyanikova and P. M. Groodchenko.
- Corner of Komityetskaya Street and the odd-numbered side of Karamyshevska Street: The Tarnopol brothers' third wallpaper factory replaced the Lang petroleum factory in 1911. The factory, which produced up to 280,000 rolls of wallpaper by 1913, was closed after the October Revolution.

The numbering of the odd-numbered side of the street was changed in 1913. According to a 1910 Odesa map, the 10A electric-train line ran along Balkovkaya Street and crossed Kartomyshevska Street. According to 1912, 1916, 1917 and 1919 maps, two lines crossed Kartomyshevska: the 10A and the Kosvennaya Street line.

=== 1920–1938 ===
The Soviets entered Odesa on 7 February 1920. The next two years were a time of privation, with increased deaths of young children and the elderly.

The wallpaper factory reopened as the Comintern factory in 1923 as the only wallpaper factory in the USSR. During its first year, the factory produced 575,000 rolls of wallpaper. In 1930, after modernization, it produced 6,000,000 rolls per year. Tapestry and wallpaper manufacturing in Ukraine began on Karamyshevska Street. The apartment house of Ivan Solyanikov at Karamyshevska 17 and Kosvennaya 86, designed by architect C. Ottone, was demolished during this period.

== Petrovsky Street (1939-1941) ==
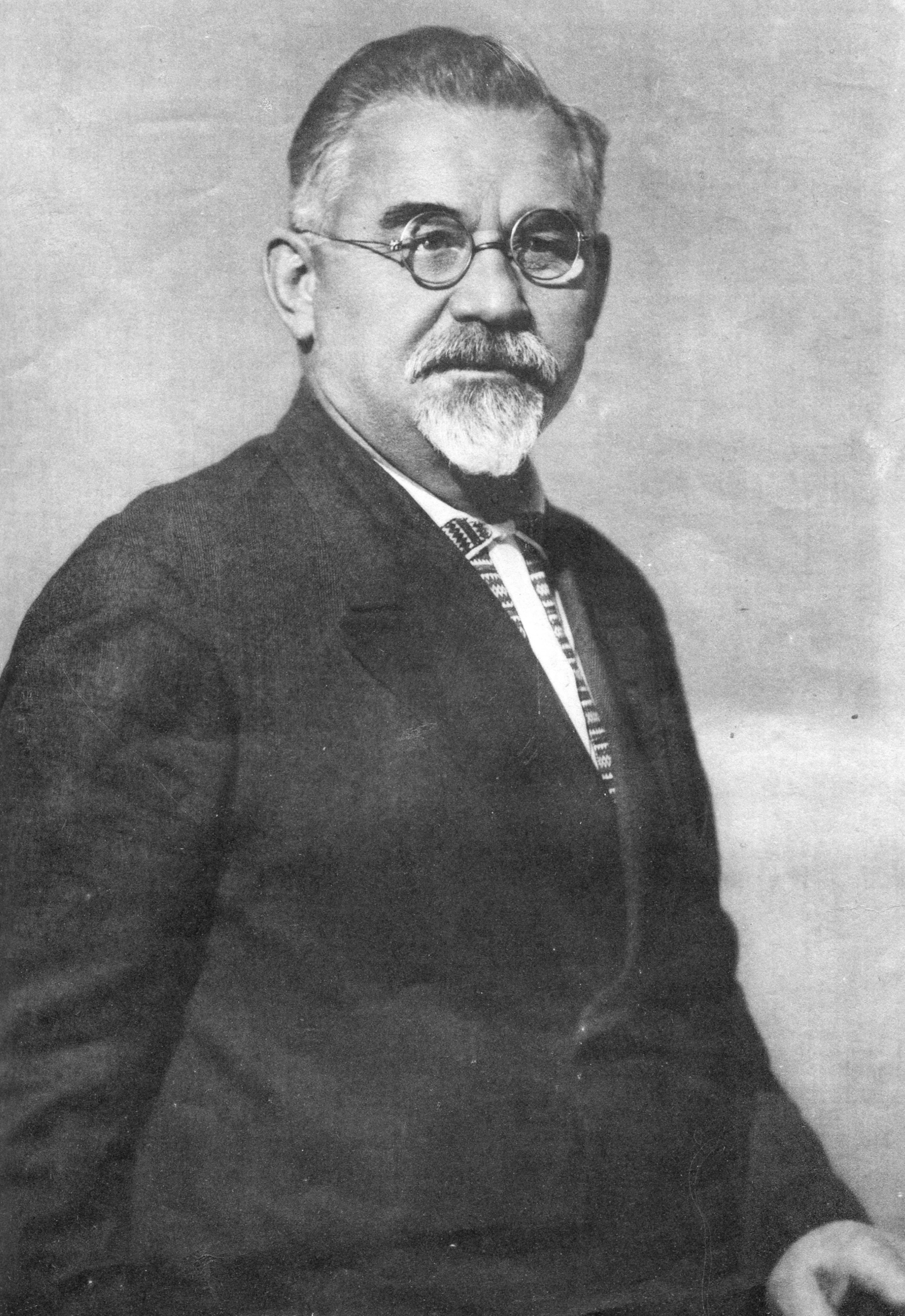
Grigory Petrovsky in 1937

In 1939, Kartamyshevska Street was renamed Petrovsky Street; it was known by local residents as Petrovskogo Street. The street was renamed in honor of Grigory Petrovsky, who often visited Odesa.

=== Defense of Odesa ===
The defense of Odesa, from 5 August to 16 October 1941, began when German and Romanian troops surrounded the city. Middle School 60 was blown up by Soviet troops in October 1941, before they left Odesa by sea to continue the siege of Sevastopol (1941–42). During the defense of the city Odesa's city hall was located at Karamyshevska Street, 10.

== Occupation and liberation ==
Petrovsky Street returned to its original name during the German and Romanian occupation. Odesa was liberated by Soviet troops under General Rodion Malinovsky on 10 April 1944. The only significant damage to buildings on Kartamyshevska Street during the Second World War was the destruction of the school.

== Different names (1945–1953) ==
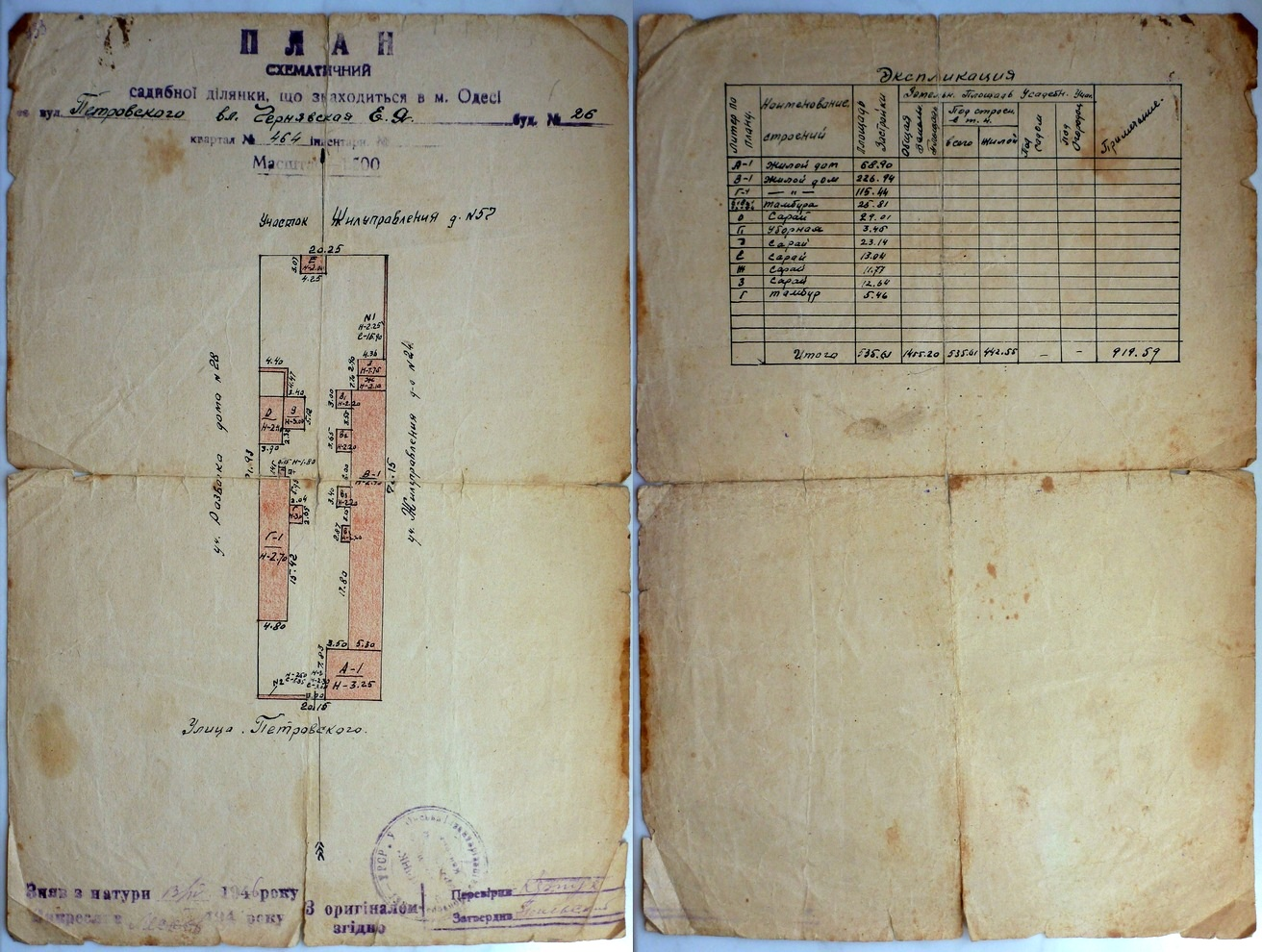
1946 map of a parcel at Petrovsky Street, 26, owned by Yelizavyeta Yakovlyevna Chernyavskaya

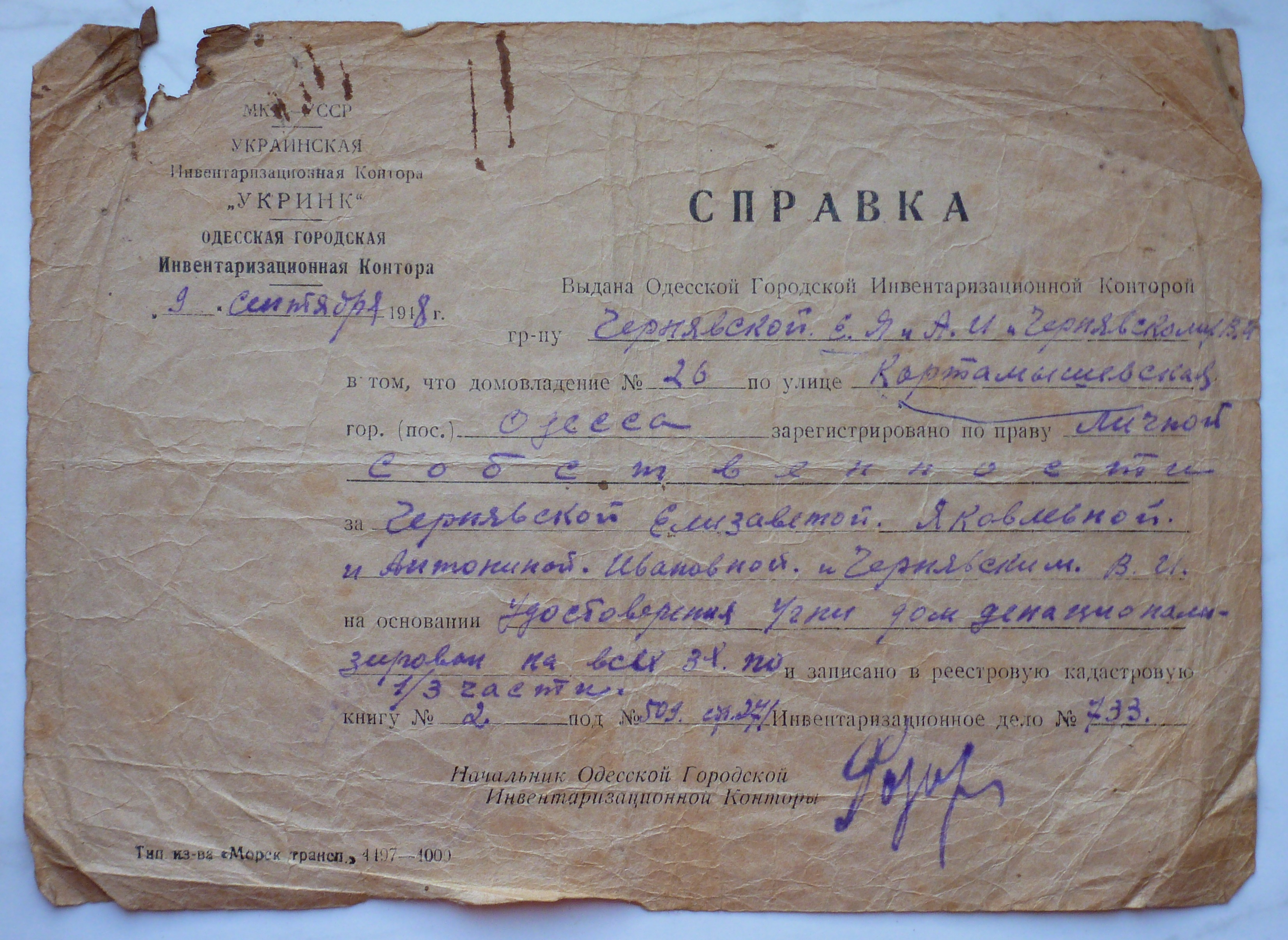
Denationalization certificate of Kartamyshevskaya, 26, dated 9 September 1948

In 1945, Kartamyshevska Street was officially renamed Sukharev Street. According to a 13 April 1946 map of a parcel at Kartamyshevska 26, the street was still known as Petrovsky Street. A 9 September 1948 denationalization certificate lists the street as Kartamyshevska Street.

During the fourth five-year plan (1946–1950), the Poligraphmach plant (Russian: Полиграфмаш) was built on the odd-numbered side of Kartamyshevska Street between Komitetskaya and Kosvennaya Streets. Replacing the Tarnopol brothers' third wallpaper factory and others houses and shops, it produced polygraph machines.

The two-storey, Soviet neoclassic house with columns and gates at Kartamyshevska 34 was built on the site of a sausage factory in 1952. From 1947 to 1970, housing was built primarily for military families.

== Radio jamming ==
In 1947, the city government transferred 11 acres of land to the Black Sea Shipping Company for an antenna installation. The large antenna facilitated communications with steamers in the Mediterranean and Red Seas and the north-eastern Indian and Atlantic Oceans.

An antenna tower for radio jamming was built at the corner of Kartamyshevska and Komitetskaya Streets between 1946 and 1961. The Odesa TV tower, built from 1956 to 1958, had a similar construction. But Odesa TV tower was higher than the tower at Katamyshevska street. Seem the tower on Kartamyshevska street was built before 1957 year. (To see the photos in article The Odesa TV tower and the photos on Church Cite).

== M. Raskova Street (1953–1995) ==
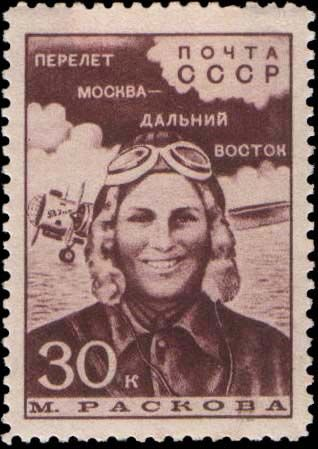
Soviet postage stamp commemorating Marina Raskova, issued in March 1939

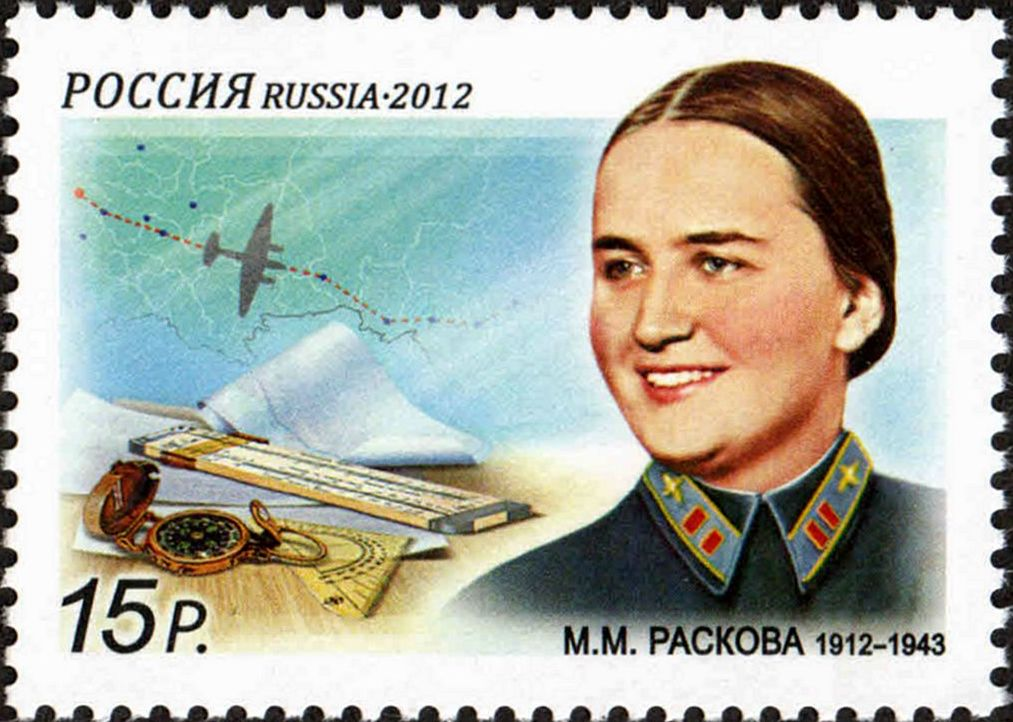
15-ruble stamp issued on 21 March 2012 commemorating the 100th birth anniversary of Hero of the Soviet Union Marina Raskova

In 1953, Kartamyshevska Street was renamed M. Raskova Street in honor of Soviet pilot Marina Raskova (1912–1943). The street was absent from tourist maps from 1970 to the 1980s. It lost its outlet to Frunze Street (Russian: Улица Фрунзе) due to construction at the intersection of Frunze and M. Raskova Streets which shortened M. Raskova Street to two blocks.

Radio jamming ended as the result of a November 1988 Politburo decision, and all jamming stations ceased operation during the night of 29–30 November. On the, Mikhail Gorbachev announced the end of jamming during an 8 December 1988 session of the UN General Assembly. An order from the Minister of Communications "On the cessation of jamming of foreign radio stations broadcasting to the Soviet Union" was signed on 19 December 1988. Around this time, jamming also ended in the Warsaw Pact countries. Construction of the First Church of Evangelical Christians and Baptists in Odesa began in 1992, very close to the tower for radio jamming, and was completed in 1997. The tower for radio jamming was deconstructed by helicopter before end of 1997 as it was as it was unable to perform its functions due to progress in radio war during the Clad War period.

== 1995 to present ==
The street returned to its original name. Kartamyshevskaya Street was included in the following districts of Odesa during the Soviet era:

- Petropavlovskiy district from 1920 (or earlier) to 1924
- Iliychevskiy district from 1924 to 1977
- Malinovskiy district from 1977 to the present

The Odesa Catacombs, under Golorovskaya, Kartamyshevska and Kosvyennaya Streets and Mikhailovsky Square, date to the 18th century. Although most entrances to the catacombs are on Golokovskaya Street, some are on Kartamyshevska Street.

== Gallery ==
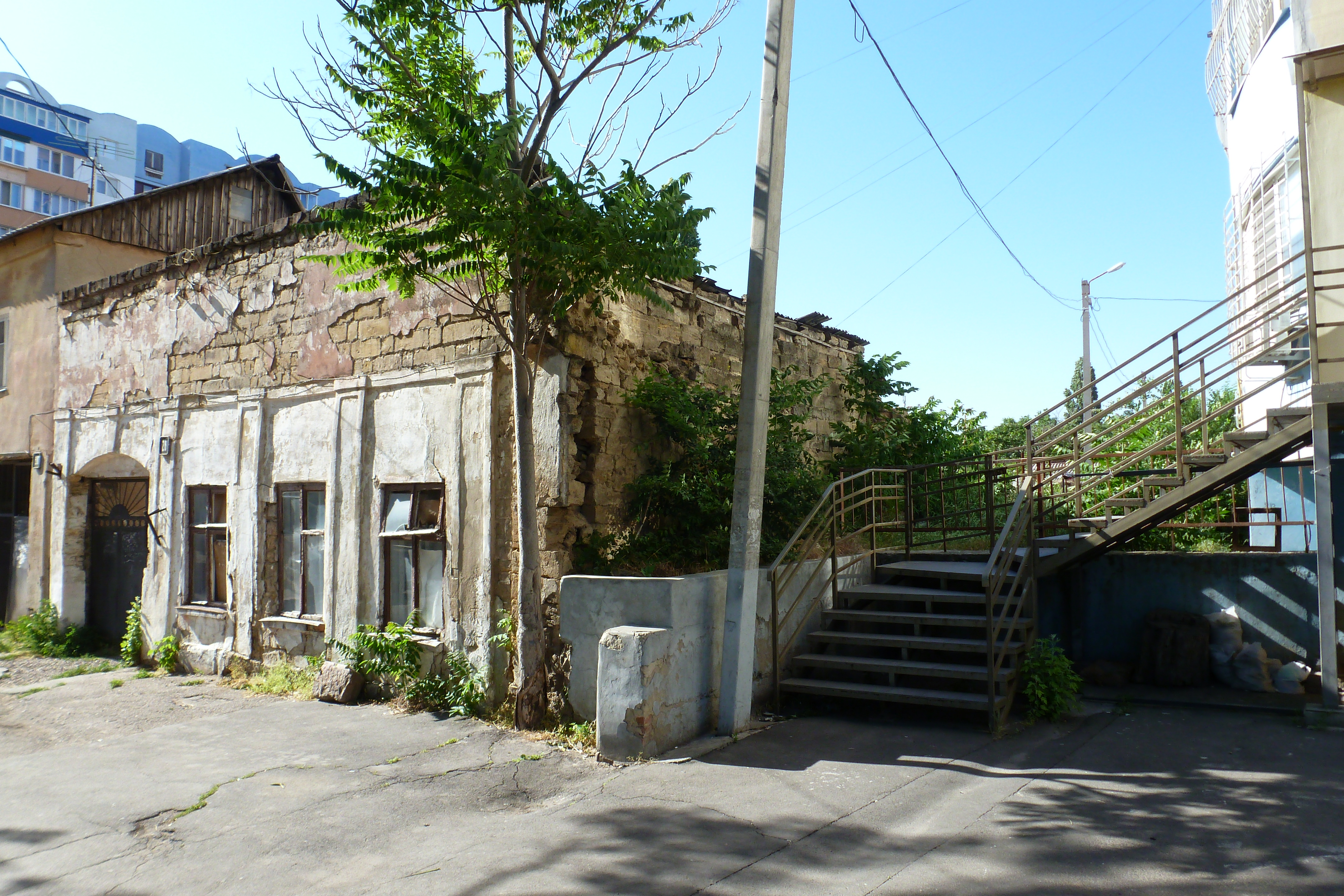
Kartamyshevska 28 and wall of demolished courtyard of Kartamyshevskaya 26

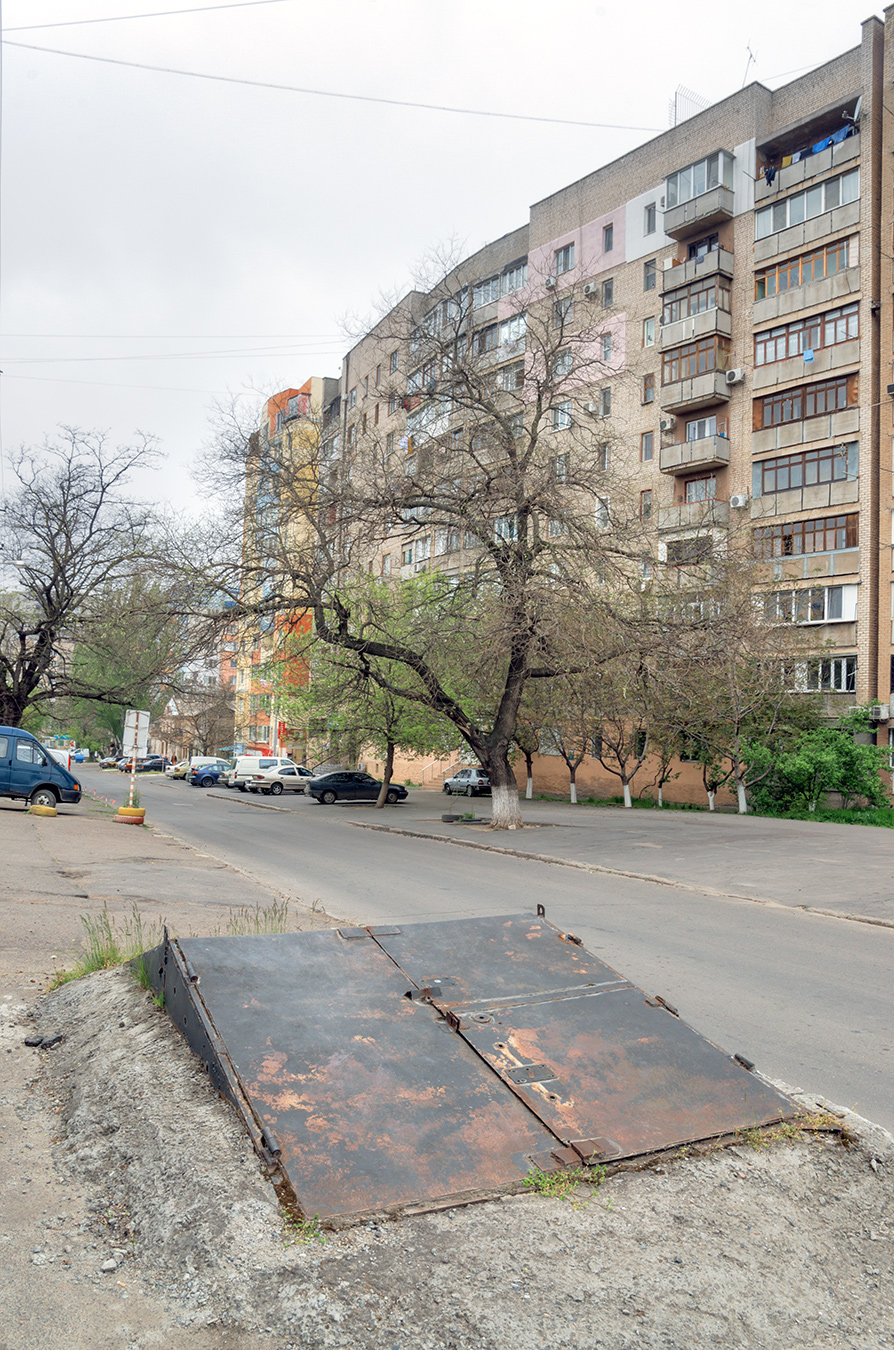
Entrance to catacombs

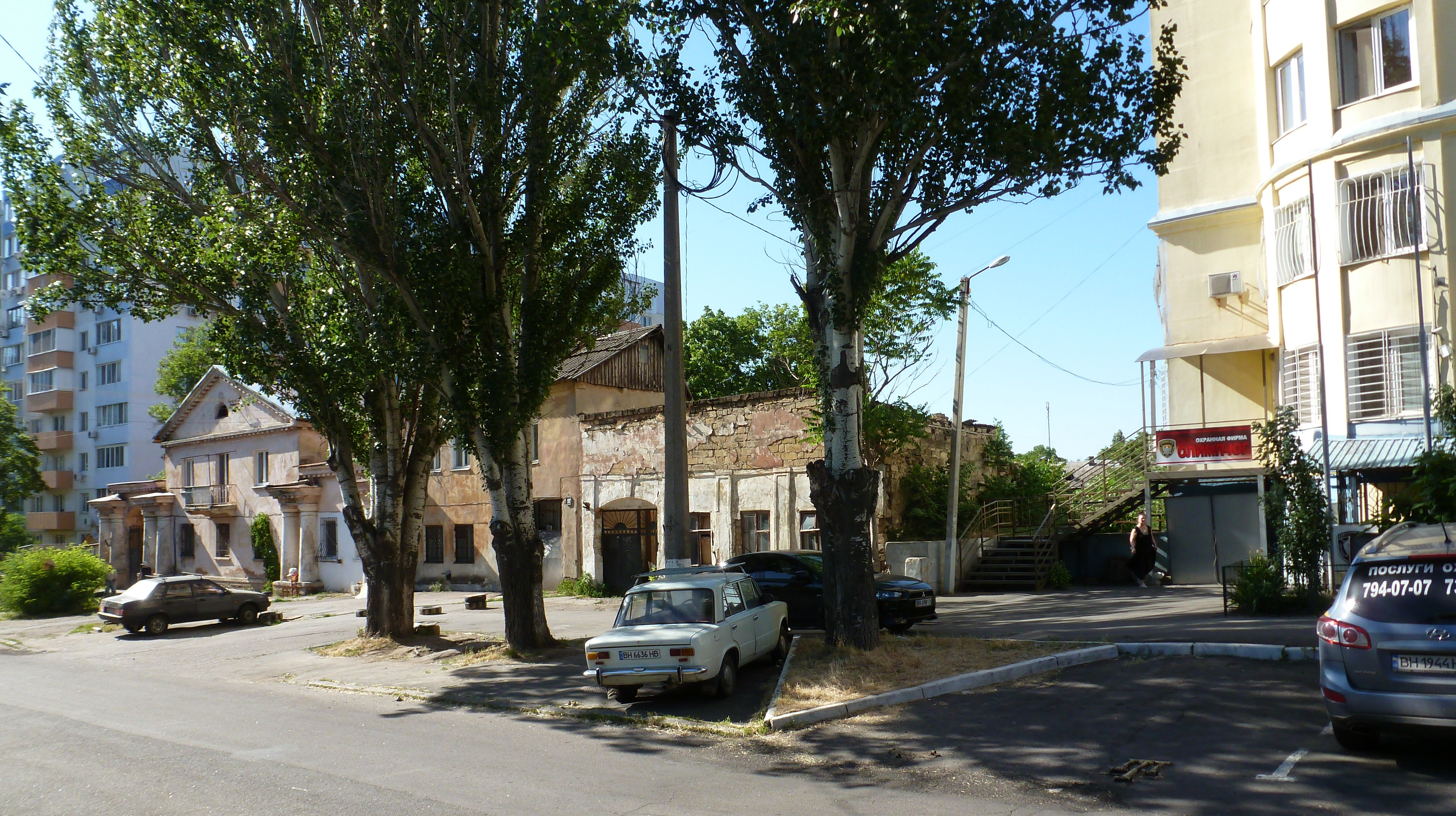
Courtyards of 28, 30 and 34

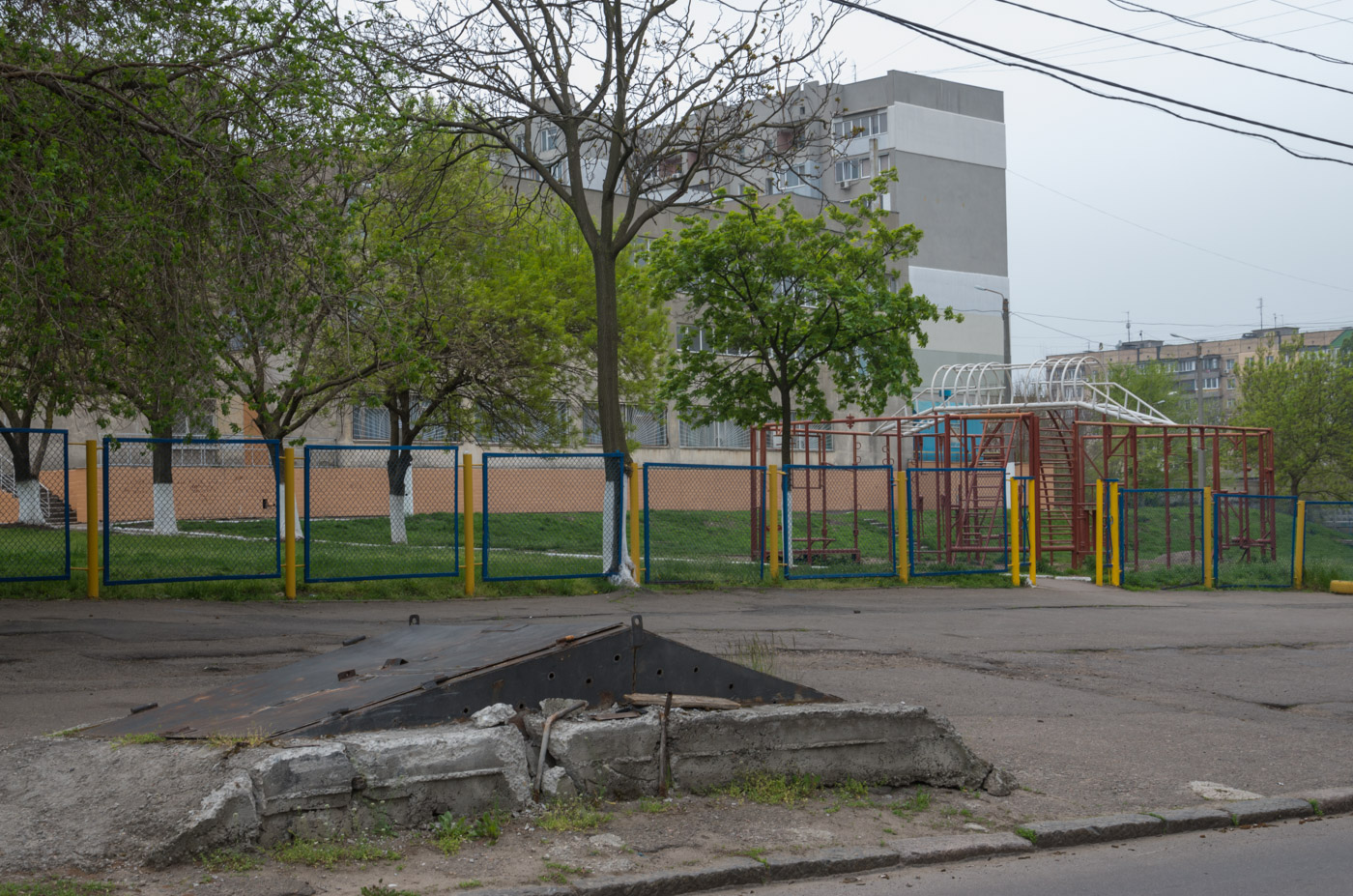
Entrance to catacombs

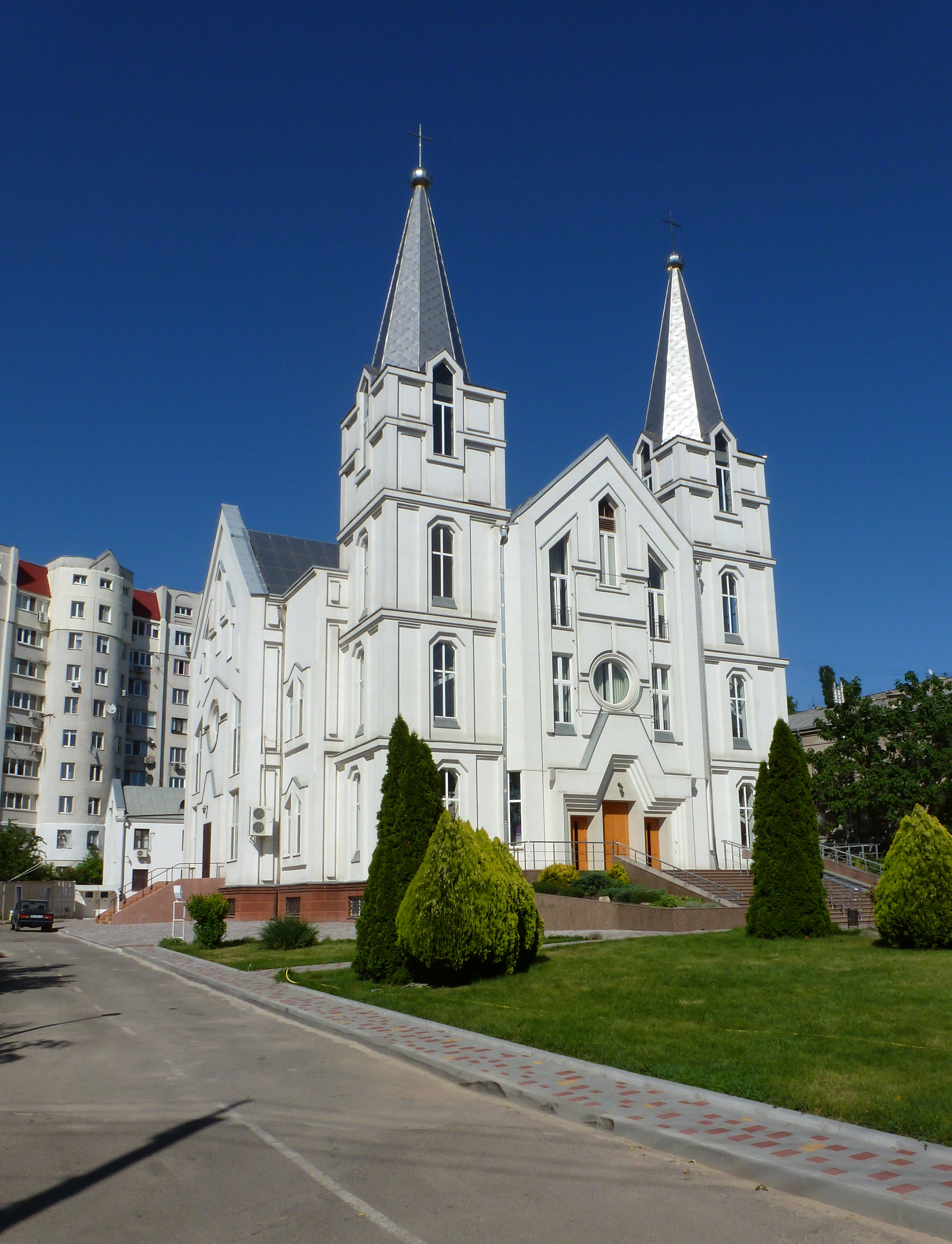
First Baptist Church

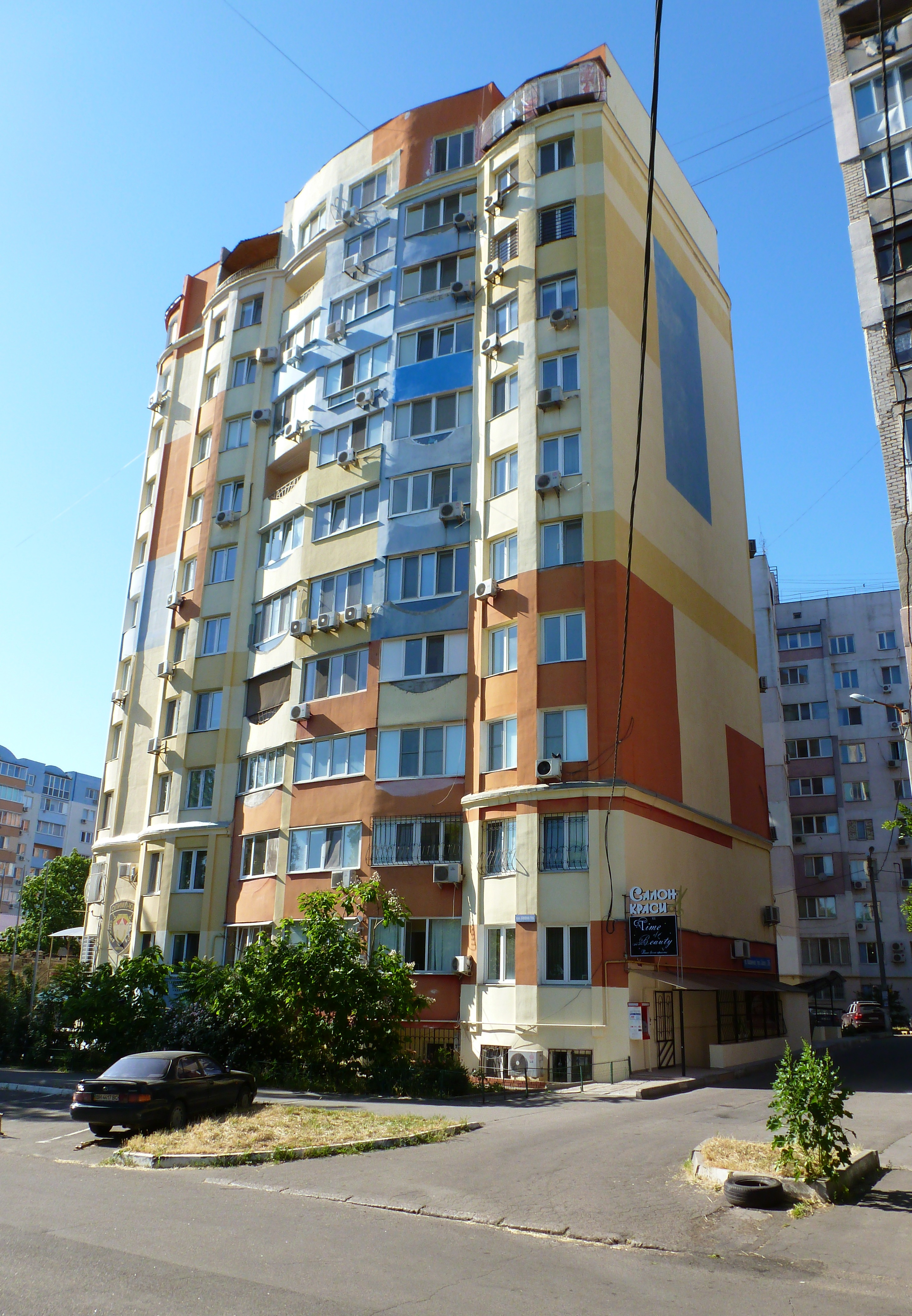
Ten-storey building

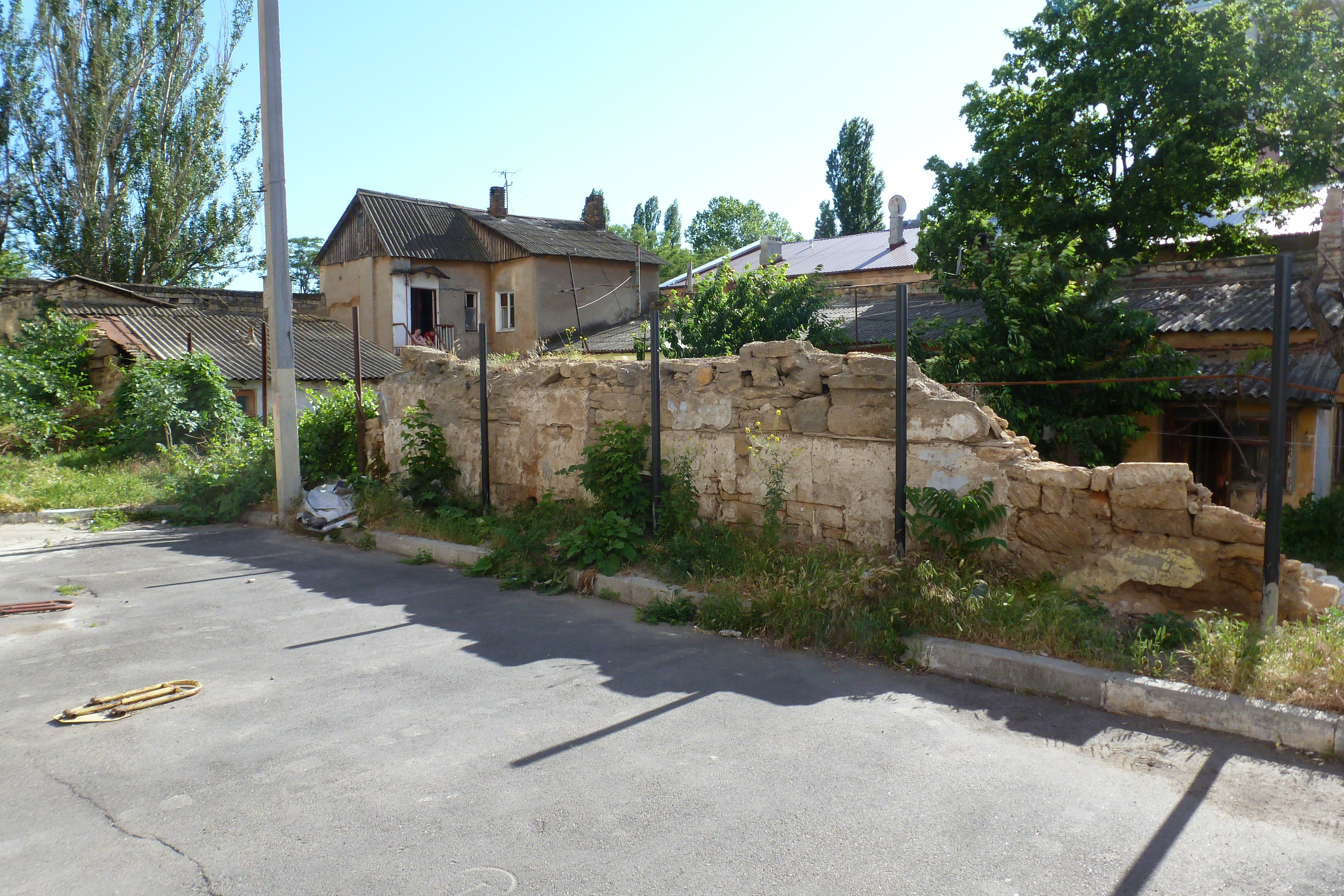
Wailing Wall on the street

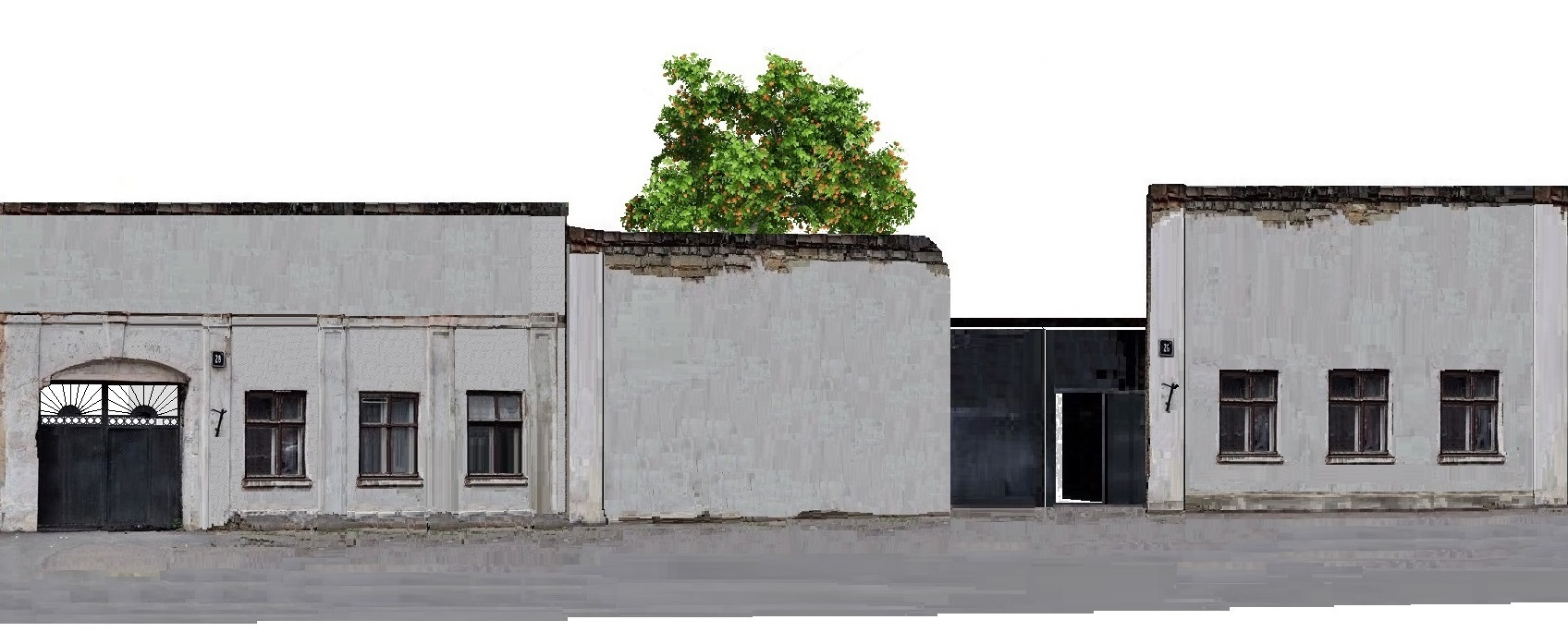
Courtyards of 26 and 28 M. Raskova Street in 1967

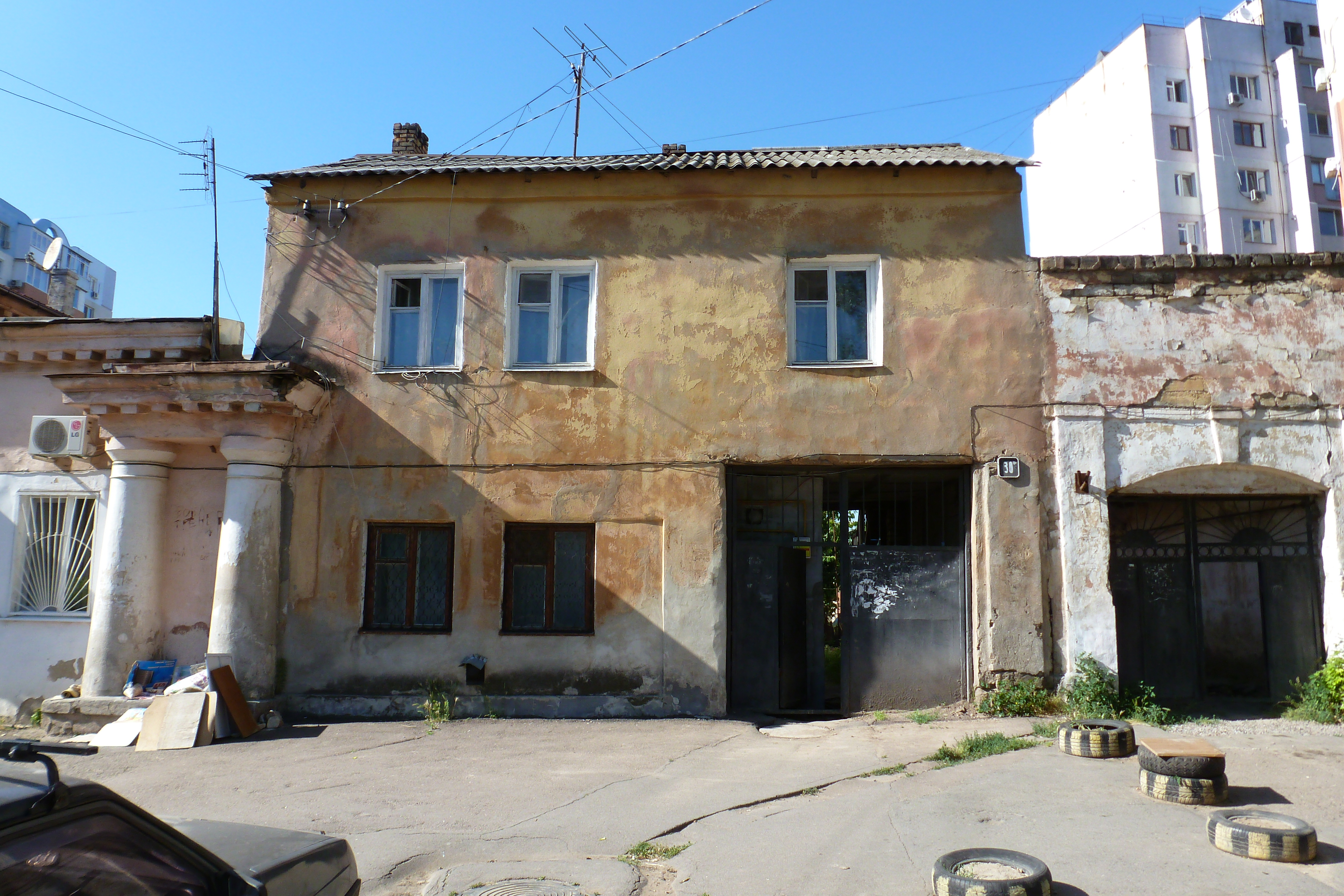
Courtyard of 30 Kartamyshevska Street in June 2017

== See also ==
- Statue of Yuriy Dolgorukiy, Moscow
- Statue of Graf Vorontsov, Odesa
- Statue of Metallurgist Anosov, Zlatoust
- Frol Kozlov
- Yekaterina Furtseva
- SS Karaganda
- SS Metallurg Anosov
